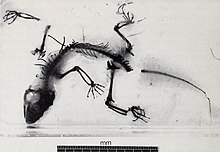
- X-ray scan of Saltuarius salebrosus (1971)

Conservation status
- Least Concern (NCA)

Scientific classification
- Kingdom: Animalia
- Phylum: Chordata
- Class: Reptilia
- Order: Squamata
- Suborder: Gekkota
- Family: Carphodactylidae
- Genus: Saltuarius
- Species: S. salebrosus

Binomial name
- Saltuarius salebrosus Covacevich, 1975

= Saltuarius salebrosus =

Rough-throated leaf-tailed gecko

Species of lizard

Saltuarius salebrosus, also known as the rough-throated leaf-tailed gecko or Central Queensland leaf-tailed gecko, is a gecko found in Australia. It is endemic to dry areas in mid-eastern and south-central Queensland.

Saltuarius salebrosus, commonly called the rough-throated leaf-tailed gecko, is a species of gecko belonging to the genus Saltuarius which translates to the "keeper of the forest". The genus Saltuarius was established in 1993 to accommodate a monophyletic group of larger species of geckos with unique interior and exterior morphological characteristics and a distinctly different chromosome number to Phyllurus. The genus Saltuarius is a long, self-sufficient, evolutionary lineage of leaf-tailed geckos, described as an innocuous, moderately sized species. Geckos are an ancient taxon of primarily nocturnal lizards, exhibiting great diversity and a worldwide distribution, occupying a wide variety of habitats and external conditions. Rough-throated leaf-tailed geckos are a group of the Carphodactylidae geckos of rainforests and rocky habitats of eastern Australia.

The species was first described by herpetologist Jeanette Covacevich in 1975. The rough-throated leaf-tailed gecko is the largest of the Australian geckos, with a snout-length up to 145 mm and a total length of 250 mm. It may be distinguished by its exceedingly tubercular throat and is primarily a cavernicolous or rock-dwelling species, found in a variety of habitats ranging from gully rainforest to drier rocky scrublands. It is native to Australia and is found mostly in ranges west and south-west of Rockhampton, Queensland. The rough-throated leaf-tailed gecko average life span of seven to nine years in the wild, with a captivity life span that ranges from ten to twenty years.

== Taxonomy ==
The species Saltuarius salebrosus was first described by Jeanette Covacevich in 1975 and it was originally placed under the genus Phyllurus and called Phyllurus salebrosus. This was later revised as a result of work published by Bauer in 1990 which examined the skeletal structure of the geckos within the Phyllurus genus. He composed a set of classification characteristics including differences in cartilage formation which allowed for reclassification and noted two distinct sub-groups within the Phyllurus genus. A new genus was formed and coined Saltuarius which this gecko was then placed under, giving it its current name Saltuarius salebrosus.

The work by Bauer in 1990 was further expanded upon by Covacevich, Couper and Moritz and published in 1993. This research employed the discipline of karyology and looked at genomic and characteristic features that distinguish the Phyllurus and Saltuarius groups. In these groups there are notable differences in the structure of the interclavicle bone. Species in the Saltuarius genus were found to have more chromosomes than those in Phyllurus which gave evidence for these groups coming from different evolutionary branches. This allowed for a new genus Saltuarius to be coined.

Members of the Phyllurus genus were then recategorized and the new genus Saltuarius was at first found to include three other species in addition to Saltuarius salebrosus. These are the Saltuarius cornutus which was first described by Ogilby in 1892, Saltuarius wyberba first described by Couper and colleagues in 1997, and Saltuaris swami first described by Wells and Wellington in 1985. Later two additional species were added to this genus, Saltuarius orraya as first described by Couper and colleagues in 2000 and Saltuarius kateae which was first described by Couper and colleagues in 2008.

== Description ==
Saltuarius salebrosus is a relatively large genus of Australian gecko and has an average nose to tail (or snout to vent) length of 14–16 cm. It is distinguishable from the other members of its genus because of its uniquely shaped tail from which it gains its colloquial name the rough-throated leaf-tailed gecko or Central Queensland leaf-tailed gecko. The tail has a flat and wide heart shape with spines present on the tip. These spines are less common with tails that have been regrown following the original tail’s severance. The tail is also mottled with patches of lighter colour which often join to form cross lines. Nearly 50% of adults have regenerated tails as it is quite easy for this species to drop their original tail.

The throat of Saltuarius salebrosus is covered with small protrusions known as tubercles which give it its distinctive rough textured throat. These tubercules are formed from excess skin tissue and distinguish this species from its close relative Phyllurus cornutus whose throat is relatively smooth.

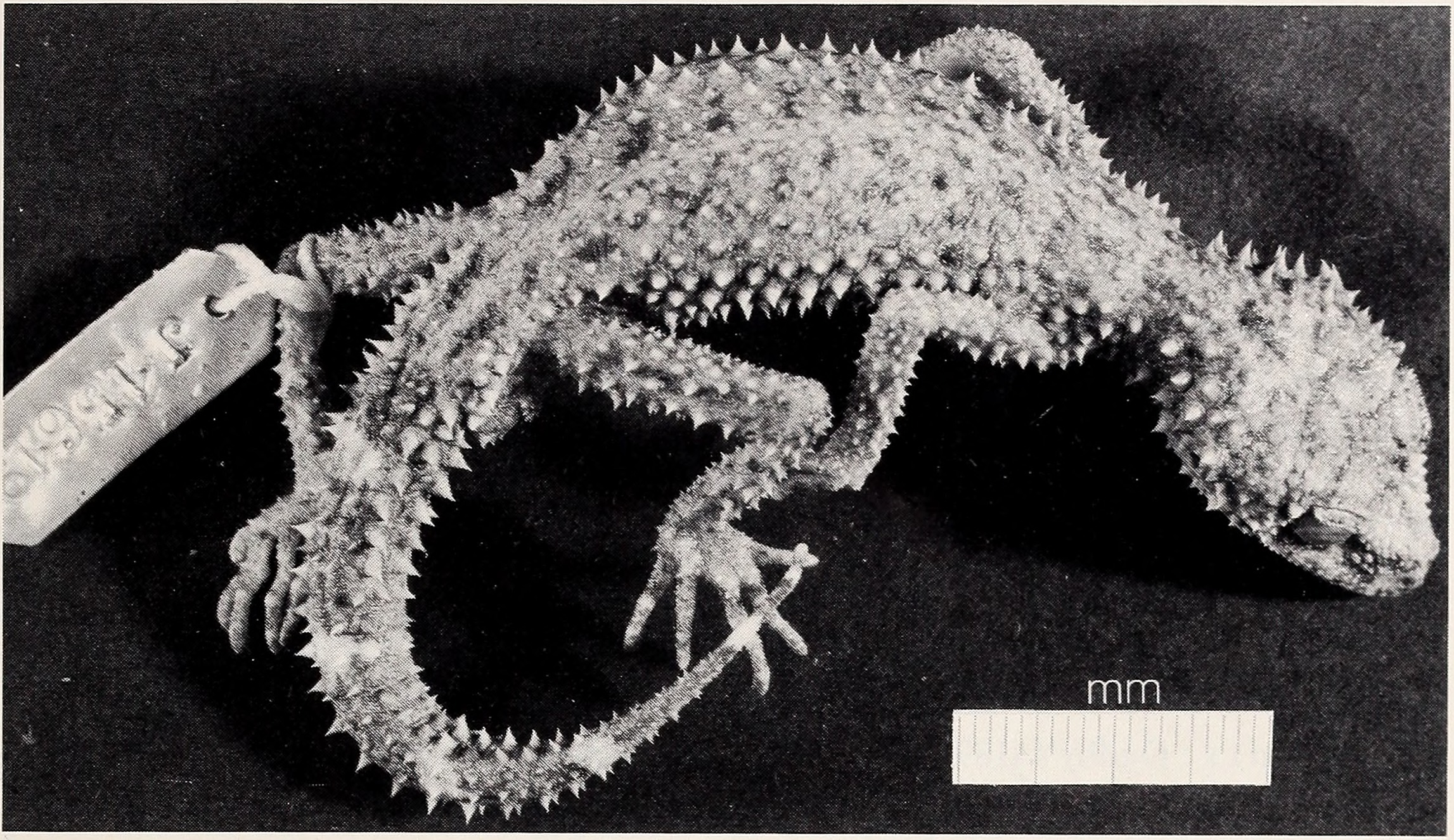
Photo of Saltuarius salebrosus demonstrates texture of the gecko's skin

The underbelly of Saltuarius salebrosus is whiteish in colour and within a skin-fold towards its legs are a set of curved spines which protrude from a cluster of scales which are larger than those seen on the rest of the body. In the males only there are pre-anal pores adjacent to these spines. The scales on the backside of this species are generally “small, flat, granular”, and are interspersed with rosettes of larger scales with a tubercule at their centre like those found on its throat. This species has 5 digits on each foot from each of which a claw protrudes. Saltuarius salebrosus is distinguishable from other members of the Saltuarius genus by its colouration and markings. The body of this species is usually brown or olive green in colour and covered in patches of lighter colour which are outlined by a thick black to brown border. Along the back of this gecko there are usually four or five of these patches, while the rest of the body is irregularly scattered with additional markings and the head usually has "two or more W-or M-shaped dark brown markings and irregular lines and reticulations". Strong horizontal lines are apparent on the legs of this species and its toes are a lighter shade to its foreleg. In these ways it is distinguishable from another member of its genus Saltuarius jackyae, which does not have the prominent body outlines or cross-lines on its legs. The unique patterning of this species allows them to camouflage against different surfaces in their environment, such as rocks and trees.

== Biology ==
Saltuarius salebrosus is identifiable by its exceedingly tubercular throat and the longer spinous tip of original tails, known to be similar to Phyllurus cornutus (northern leaf-tailed geckos). Saltuarius salebrosus can be distinguished from Phyllurus cornutus by its chin scalation, as rough-throated leaf-tailed geckos are rough covered with raised tubercules, whereas S. cornutus is smooth with no raised tubercules. With the snout to vent length at 14 cm, rough-throated leaf-tailed geckos are one of Australia’s largest 112 described species of geckos. Saltuarius salebrosus can be identified by its large, triangular, flat head with a strongly depressed body. The skin of the rough-throated leaf-tailed geckos exhibits small, hair-like microstructures called spines, which vary in length from 0.30 to 3 micrometres among species. The rough-throated leaf-tailed gecko’s colouring is usually in various shades or brown or green with a mottling that looks similar to lichen. This makes it very difficult to distinguish from the trees that the geckos live in. The gecko’s original tail is a flat, fleshy, appendage and ornamented with colours and textural tubercules and spines. In the event that the tail is lost, it regrows, the new tail will be broader and flatter with different coloration, and a shorter tip.

== Reproduction ==
Like other members of the reptile class, Saltuarius salebrosus reproduces by oviparous means. It has a clutch size of 2 meaning it releases 2 eggs per breeding event. These eggs have a soft shell, and their incubation period is estimated to be approximately 103 days. Hatchlings of this species are at this point assumed to have a similar size to those of a closely related species the Saltuarius cornutus, with a nose to tail length of 50.63 – 51.41 mm.

Reproduction under oviparous represents the ancestral mode of reproduction in reptiles. Oviparity reptile eggs are laid quite early, and the embryos are relatively undeveloped. While rough-throated leaf-tailed gecko can produce 2–3 clutches during breeding season, they are unable to reproduce in cold climates due to low temperatures which prevent the eggs from developing. It is important that plenty of calcium and vitamin D3 is provided during this process, to allow for proper bone development during the growth of hatchlings and juveniles.

This process includes the female gecko digging a nest into the soil at little depth under the litter of the forest, laying two eggs and the covering the eggs with dirt and leaves. After, the female places the eggs in the nest, limited parental care is shown, as eggs and hatchlings are left on their own. Each nest can contain up to 14 eggs from multiple females in a single communal nest, females will sometimes lay multiple clutches of eggs per season. Reproduction and the length of incubation period is closely related to the species Saltuarius cornutus, due to close taxonomic affinity.

== Distribution and habitat ==
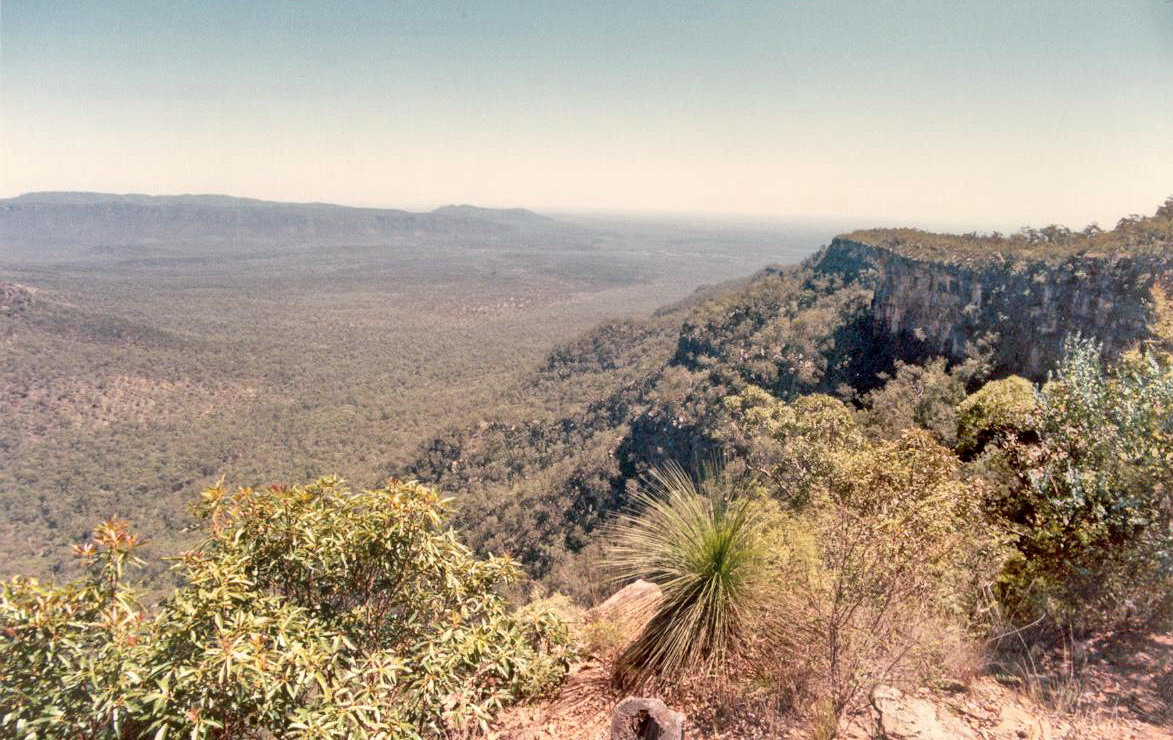
Blackdown Tableland, an area in which Saltuarius salebrosus is commonly found.

The thirteen named species of leaf-tailed geckos are all located along eastern Australia between Sydney and Cape York Peninsula as an obligatory rainforest species. Due to the governments ban on exports of reptiles from Australia since 1960s, the gecko family is endemic to the continental Australia. Leaf-tailed geckos are mainly associated with tropical and subtropical rainforests, with the minority located on heaths on sandstones and granites in Eastern Australia. Leaf-tailed geckos are confined to Eastern Australia, with a highly localised distribution with only two sites having more than one-leaf tailed gecko species. Rough-throated leaf-tailed geckos are the most widespread of the leaf-tail geckos in rainforests and rocky habitats of mid-eastern Queensland. This species of the rough-throated leaf-tail gecko is endemic to dry areas in Mid-eastern and Southern Queensland, Australia.

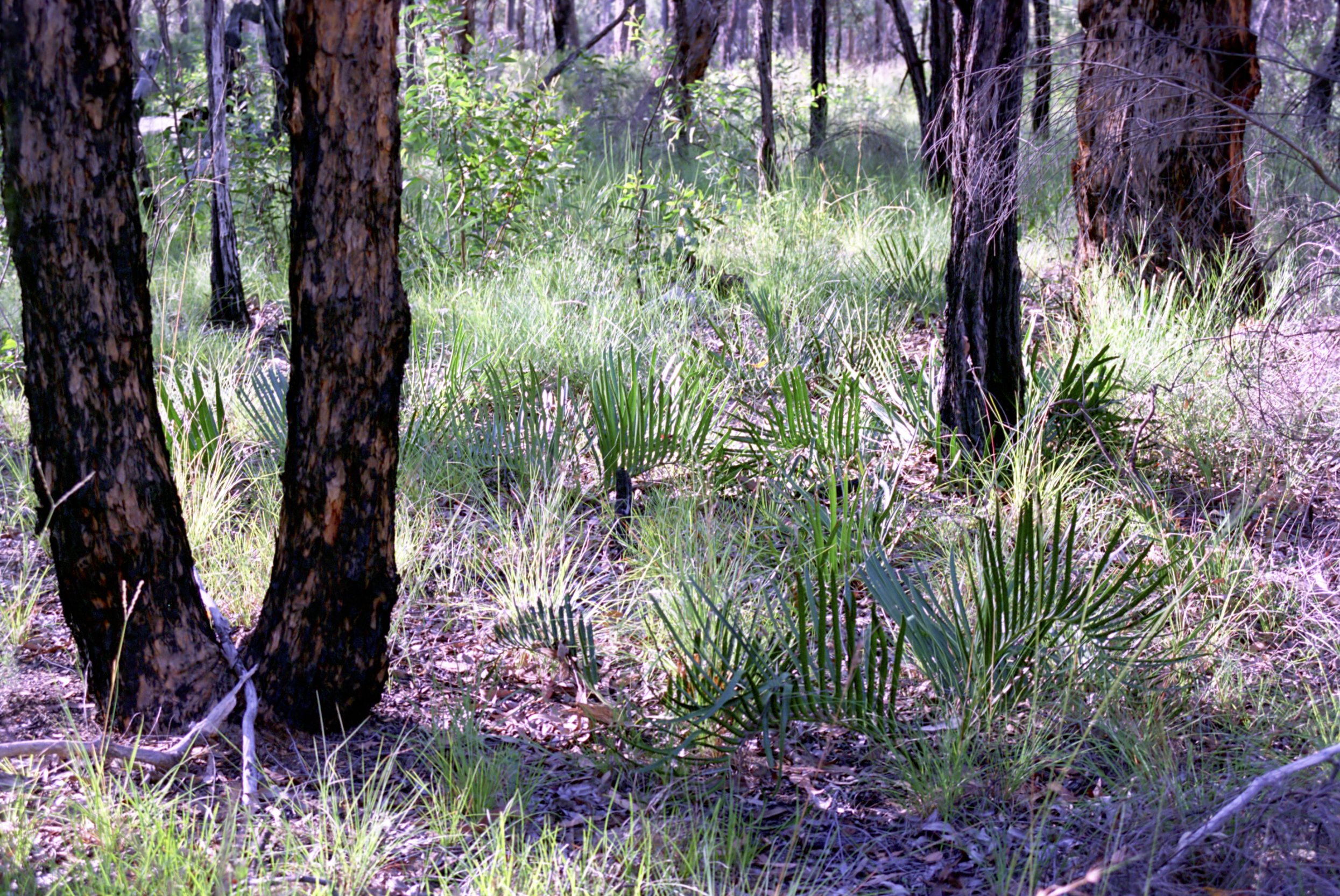
Photo of rainforest floor of Blackdown Tableland Queensland

It is primarily a cavernicolous rock-dwelling species, that is found in a variety of habitats ranging from gully rainforests to drier rocky scrublands. Within these environments it shows a preference for sandstone outcrops and open forest environments. It is commonly found in areas ranging between west and south-west of Rockhampton, Queensland, including the Blackdown Tableland and Dawes Ranges areas.

Additionally, this species has a tendency to live in dispersed clusters as highly localised communities. The "Many Peaks Range" (24°31'S, 151°29'E), which this species is known to inhabit is the only known location that supports more than one species of leaf tailed gecko. This area is also home to the Phyllus Caudiannulatus.

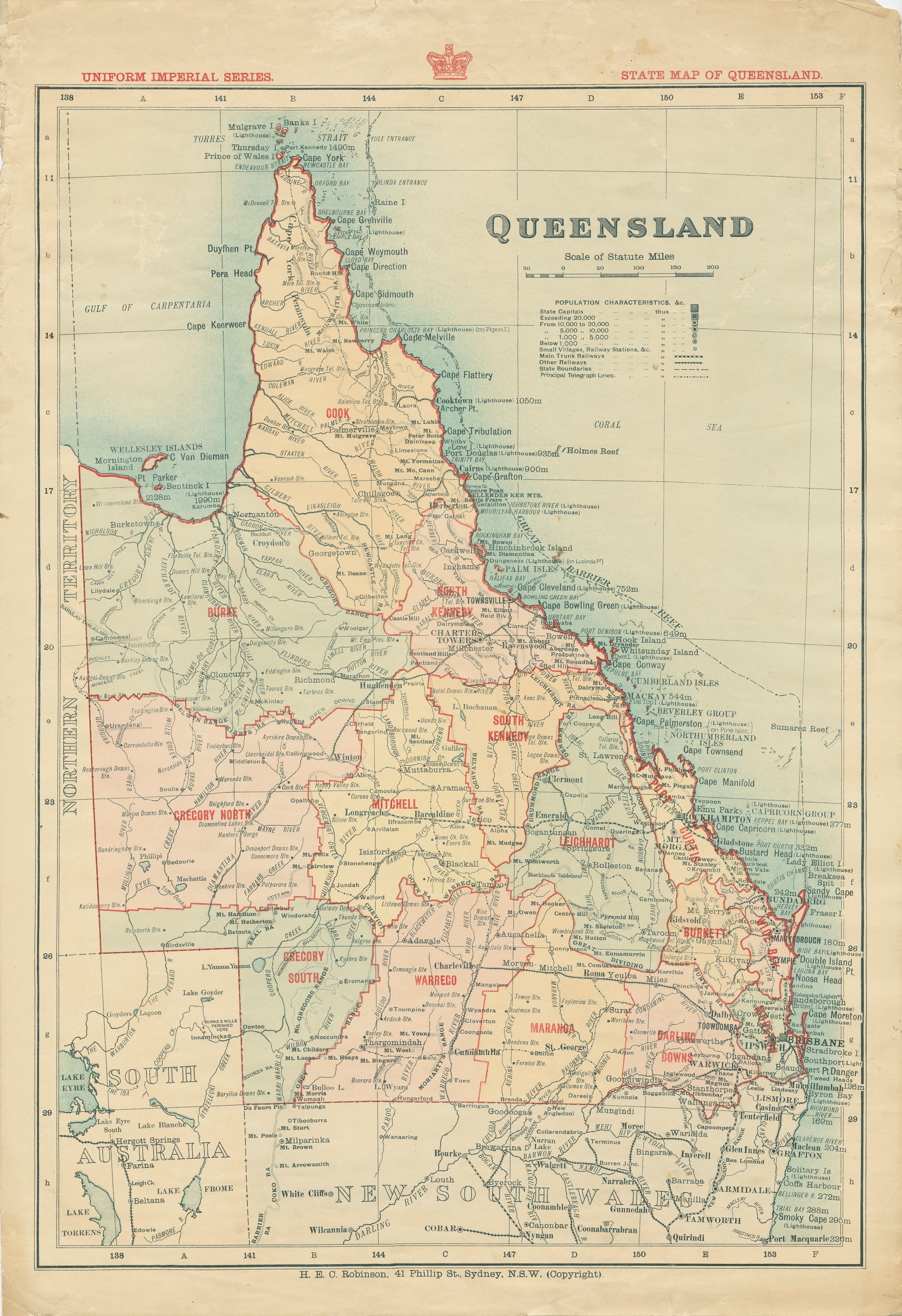
State map of Queensland of where Saltuarius Salebrosus is endemic.

== Behaviour ==
The rough-throated leaf-tailed gecko is a nocturnal reptile that emerges at night moving about its rainforest habitat to forage for large beetles, cockroaches, and spiders. The rough-throated leaf-tailed gecko shelters during the day in crevices, peeling bark or under rocks. It emerges each evening from narrow rock crevices within the trunks of the rainforest fig trees. The gecko is a tree-dwelling nocturnal animal that adapts with ease due to its sticky toes, curved claws and long tail which can be wrapped around branches to ensure stability on the trees. The geckos typical behaviour includes sitting motionless while clinging to the surface with its bird-like feet. When sleeping, rough-throated leaf-tailed geckos face downwards against the surface they are resting on. If distressed when sleeping, the gecko will open its jaw wide, exposing a bright red mouth and emitting a loud distress call, charging aggressors while vocalising. In the instance that the rough-throated leaf-tailed gecko is threatened or attacked, the gecko arches its back. If the tiny scales on its body, limbs and sides are not able to discourage the aggressors, the gecko waves its tail from side to side to draw attention away from the head. The rough-throated leaf-tailed gecko is also able to flatten its own body to reduce its own shadow, as another form of protection from predators. In captivity, rough-throated leaf-tailed geckos are known to favour occupying crevices by themselves as opposed to crevices with another individual, regardless of sex. This results in asocial behaviour.

Saltuarius salebrosus, like other members of its genus, is a slow moving species and so favours slow movements and camouflage as a means of safety as opposed to "speed and agility". In the instance that the rough-throated leaf-tailed gecko is threatened or attacked, it waves its tail. Tail-loss for rough-throated leaf-tailed geckos is a common feature for evading predatory threats, and if required, it will discard its tail to escape safely. The skin of rough-throated leaf-tailed geckos resembles the rough bark of the tree, allowing them to hide from predators. Rough-throated leaf-tailed geckos are known as large, impressive and masters of highly effective camouflage.

== Diet ==
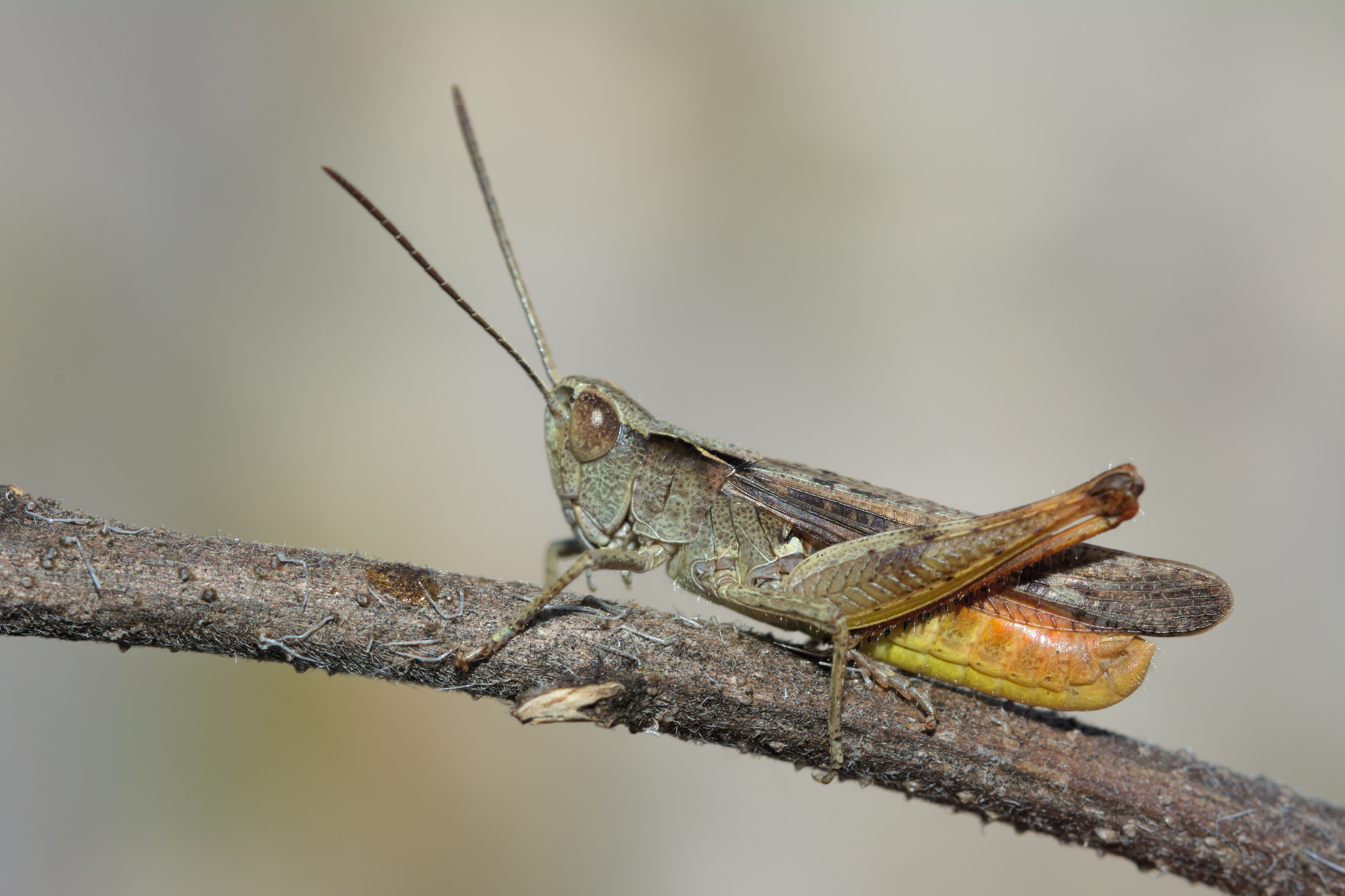
A member of the Orthoptera family which comprises the diet of Saltuarius salebrosus

Rough-throated leaf-tailed geckos are carnivorous and their diet consists of a variety of invertebrates including spiders (Aranae), cockroaches (Blattaria), and other small insects from the Orthoptera order including grasshoppers and locusts. Land snails make up a substantial part of their diet. Due to the large size of the head of this gecko it is able to consume prey that is quite large compared to its own body size.

When in captivity, their diet consists of standard commercially available insects.

== Captivity ==
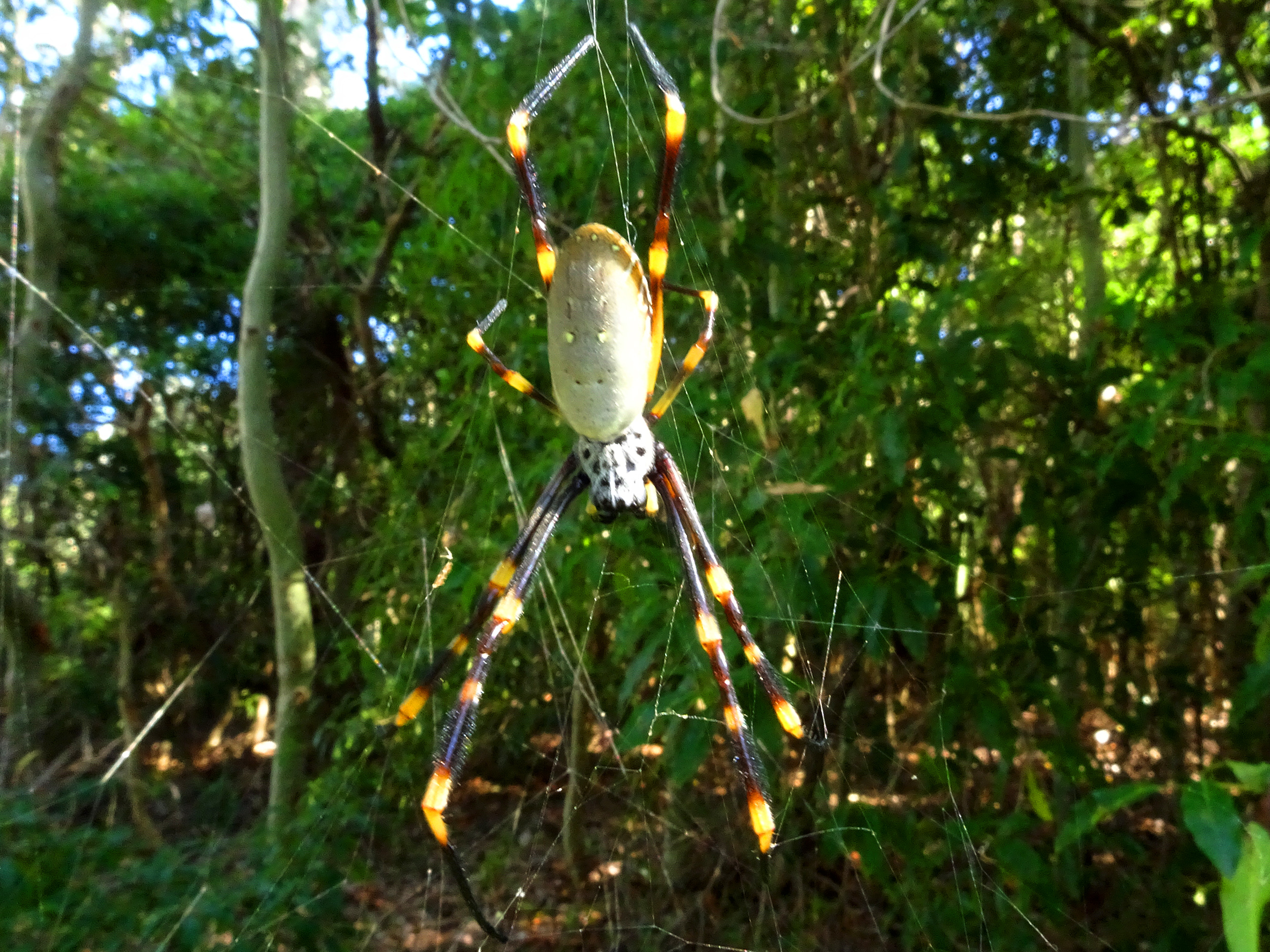
Gold orb weaver spider which is a invertebrate that is a part of Saltuarius salebrosus diet

The central Queensland distribution makes the rough-throated leaf-tailed gecko the hardiest of all the leaf-tailed geckos in captivity. They are known to have "long lives" and be "undemanding captives" as they can survive up to 15 years in captivity. Rough-throated leaf tail geckos are capable of withstanding higher temperatures than other species of geckos. They can tolerate temperatures up to 30 degrees, provided that the enclosure is not exposed to direct light for extended periods of time. However, temperatures that exceed this may prove fatal for the gecko.

Enclosures should duplicate the natural habitat of the rough-throated leaf-tailed gecko as closely as possible. The enclosure should be set up using the upright strips of rigid tree bark with extra climbing branches to provide the gecko with access to all areas of the enclosure. The standard captivity houses two or three geckos in an enclosure with measurements 60 x 40 x 80 cm high. The enclosure must be well ventilated with vents at the top and bottom of the cage to allow for efficient air movement, with a heat source no warmer than 32 degrees. This is not required over winter nights, when a cooling period should be offered. Standard commercially available insects including crickets, mealworms, cockroaches and grasshoppers make up their diet and can be supplied three times a week during breeding season, reducing to once every 2–3 weeks in winter.

=== Breeding ===
In breeding season for rough-throated leaf-tailed geckos, the captivity should be set up similar to the adult enclosure but with a larger laying box and a slightly warmer incubation temperature of 26 to 28 degrees. Rough-throated leaf-tailed geckos do not start laying their first eggs till mid-late October, which is later than most geckos. It will take approximately 100 days for the eggs to hatch. Once juveniles are born, they can be raised in smaller captives measuring 150 x 150 x 200 mm high, set up in a similar way to the adult enclosure. The captivity must be misted every second day, and food must be provided 10 days after hatching. However, it can be noted that the rough-throated leaf-tailed geckos are slow growers, taking around three to four years to reach maturity.

== Conservation status and threats ==
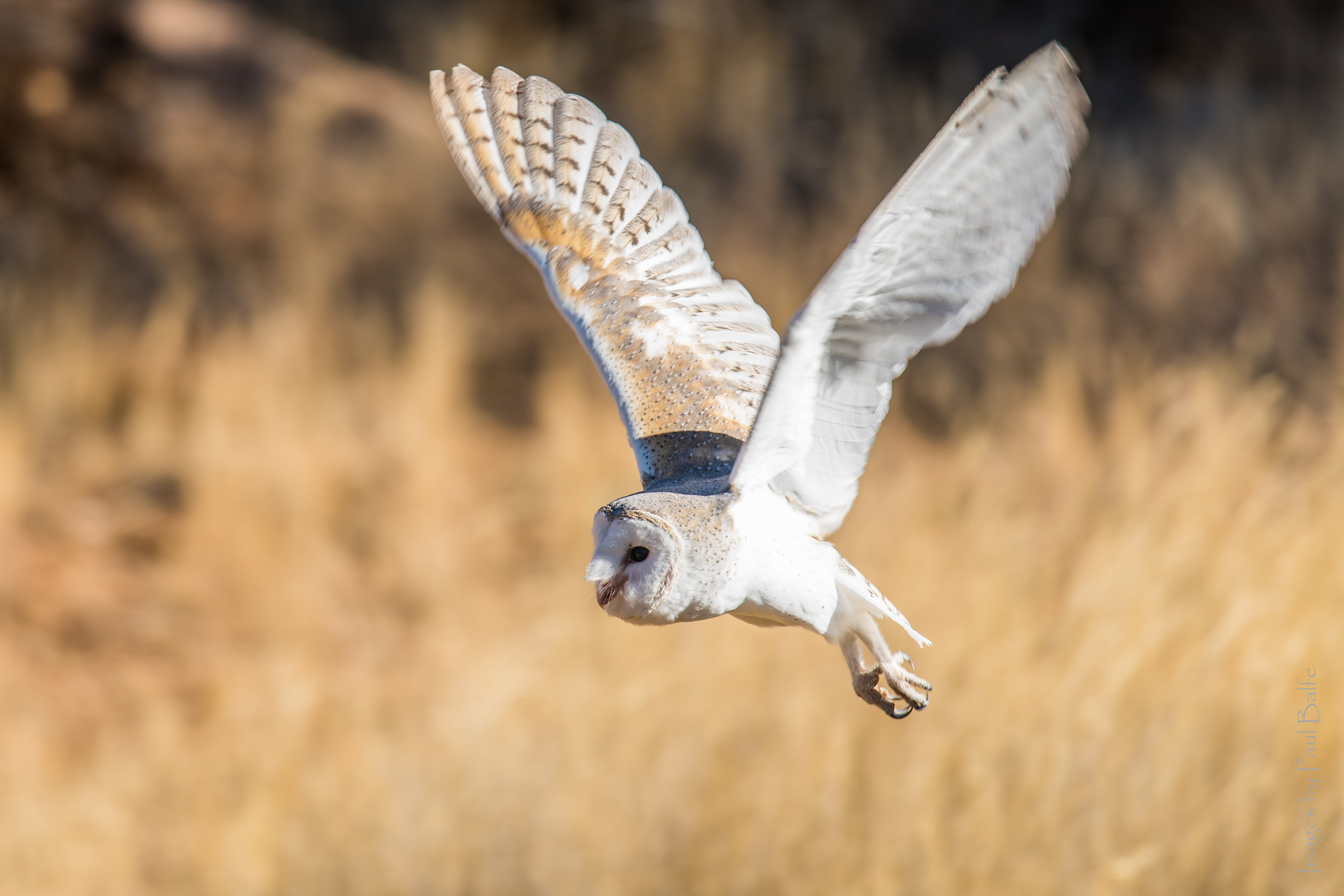
The eastern barn owl is a natural predator of Saltuarius salebrosus

Under the conservation status by Queensland parks and wildlife service, Saltuarius salebrosus is stated as "not threatened" with a conservation status of least concern under the Nature Conservation Act 1992 classification system.

=== Threats ===
Threats to this species include habitat loss and degradation and the introduction of new predators. The habitat of Saltuarius salebrosus is highly susceptible to climate change as this modifies the preferred climatic conditions. As these conditions change these areas no longer become habitable for this species. In addition, land clearing removes habitable areas, and the introduction of agricultural regions leaves the surrounding areas susceptible to degradation by livestock. This occurs due to livestock trampling non-agricultural areas which makes the nutrient rich topsoil more susceptible to alluvial erosion. Additionally, farming activities can result in excess nutrient loads being deposited in natural ecosystems. In conjunction these two factors disturb the natural nutrient balance of the ecosystem, changing its ability to support the species which inhabit the area.

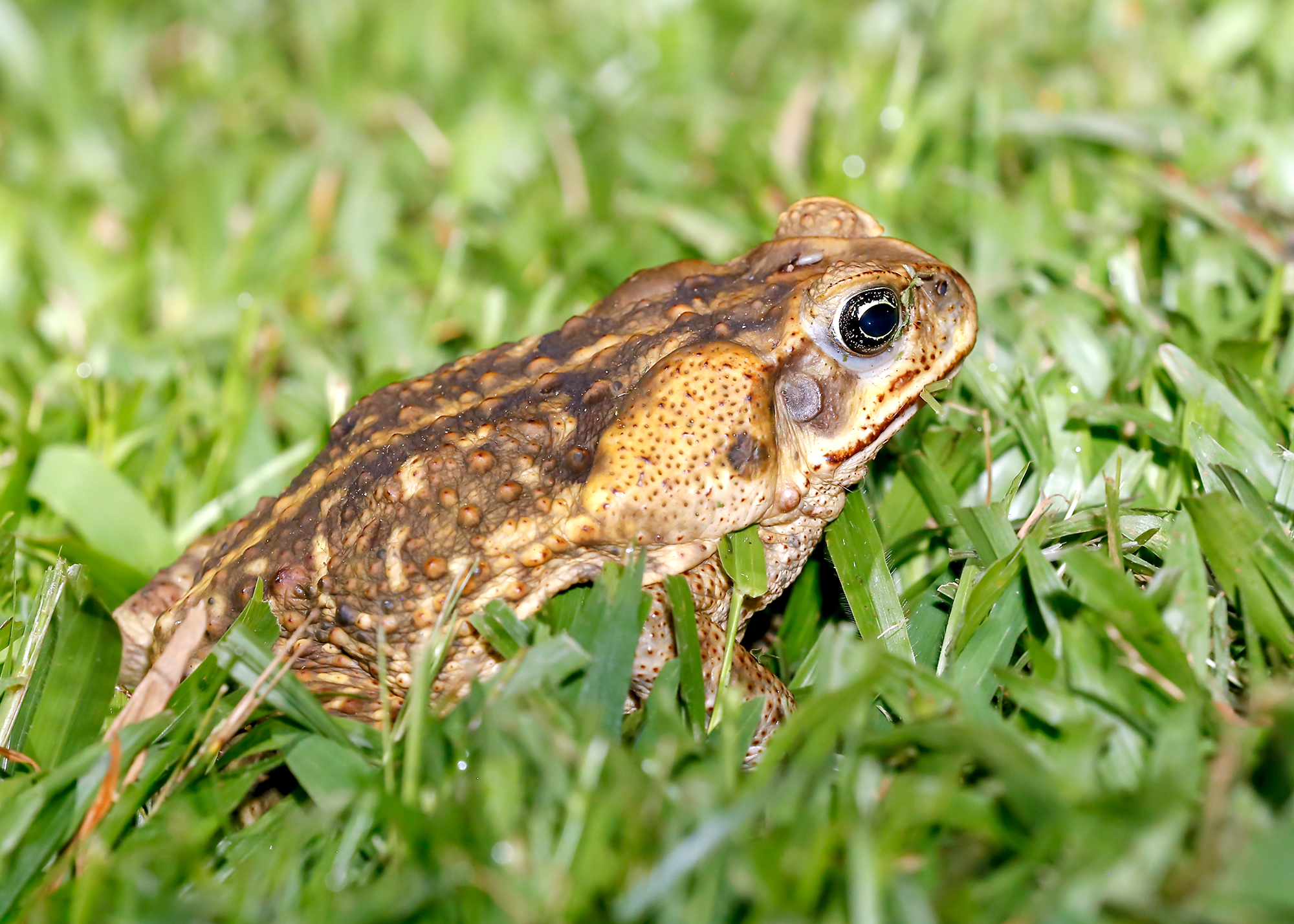
The cane toad is an introduced species which predates on Saltuarius salebrosus

Saltuarius salebrosus is at risk from its natural predators such as snakes, owls and birds. Introduced species place further pressure on this species as they become additional predators. Those threatening this species include the cane toad, foxes, and pigs. Tail-loss for rough-throated leaf-tailed geckos is a common feature for evading predatory threats to escape safety. The skin of the rough-throated leaf-tailed gecko resembles the rough bark of the tree, allowing the gecko to hide from predators and blend in perfectly with moss-covered tree trunks they inhibit. Rough-throated leaf-tailed geckos are labelled by some herpetologists as large, impressive and masters of highly effective camouflage.
