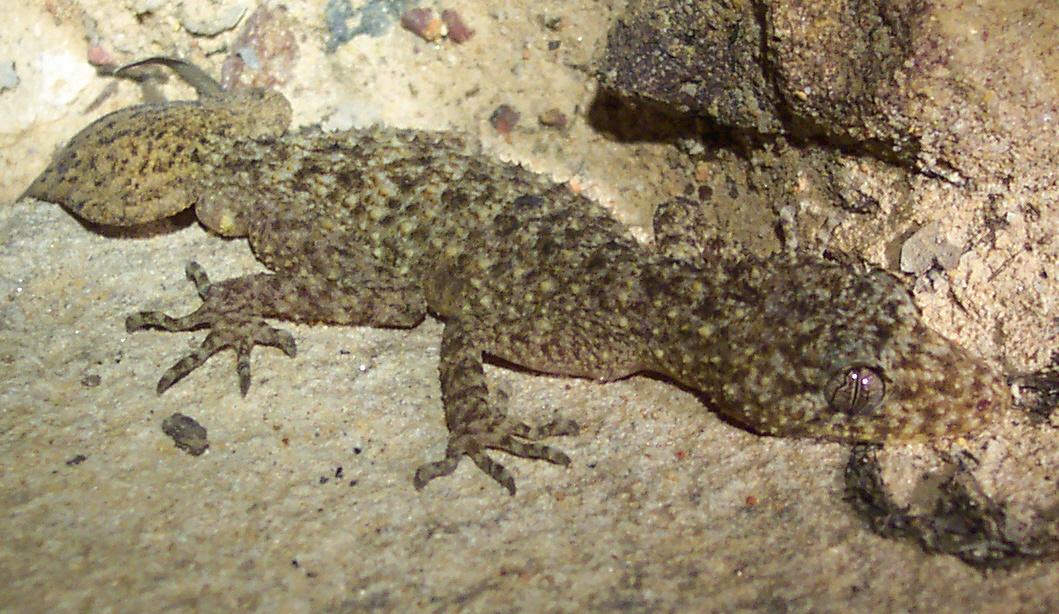
- Broad-tailed gecko (Phyllurus platurus)

Scientific classification
- Kingdom: Animalia
- Phylum: Chordata
- Class: Reptilia
- Order: Squamata
- Suborder: Gekkota
- Family: Carphodactylidae
- Genus: Phyllurus; Schinz, 1822

= Phyllurus =

Genus of lizards

Phyllurus, from Ancient Greek φύλλον (phúllon), meaning "leaf", and οὐρά (ourá), meaning "tail", is a small genus of Australian leaf-tailed geckos, lizards in the family Carphodactylidae. Rarely seen outside their native habitat, they are notable for their highly effective camouflage which is in part aided by the spiny tubercles that cover every body part.

Most member species, except for P. caudiannulatus, P. gulbaru and P. kabikabi, have very flattened, leaf-shaped tails. Some of these species have recently been reassigned to the genus Saltuarius. The Phyllurus geckos resemble the Uroplatus geckos of Madagascar. This is an example of convergent evolution because they are not closely related. As of 2023, Scawfell Island leaf-tailed gecko is the last known species of gecko to be found in Australia.

== Species ==
The following species are recognized as being valid.

- Phyllurus amnicola Couper, Schneider, Hoskin & Covacevich, 2000 – Mount Elliot leaf-tailed gecko
- Phyllurus caudiannulatus Covacevich, 1975 – Bulburin leaf-tailed gecko
- Phyllurus championae Couper, Schneider, Hoskin & Covacevich, 2000– Champion's leaf-tailed gecko
- Phyllurus gulbaru Hoskin, Couper & Schneider, 2003 – Gulbaru leaf-tailed gecko
- Phyllurus isis Couper, Covacevich & Moritz, 1993 – Mount Blackwood leaf-tailed gecko
- Phyllurus kabikabi Couper, Hamley & Hoskin, 2008 – Oakview leaf-tailed gecko
- Phyllurus nepthys Couper, Covacevich & Moritz, 1993 – Eungella leaf-tailed gecko
- Phyllurus ossa Couper, Covacevich & Moritz, 1993 – Mackay Coast leaf-tailed gecko
- Phyllurus pinnaclensis Hoskin, Bertola & Higgie, 2019 – Pinnacles leaf-tailed gecko
- Phyllurus platurus (Shaw, 1790) – broad-tailed gecko
- Phyllurus fimbriatus Hoskin, 2023 - Scawfell Island leaf-tailed gecko

The northern leaf-tailed gecko (previously Phyllurus cornutus Ogilby, 1892), is now placed in the genus Saltuarius.

Nota bene: A binomial authority in parentheses indicates that the species was originally described in a genus other than Phyllurus.
