= Southern leaf-tailed gecko =

Southern leaf-tailed gecko is a common name for several Australian lizards and may refer to:

- Phyllurus platurus
- Saltuarius swaini
