= Cumberland Island (disambiguation) =

Cumberland Island may refer to:

- Cumberland Island, an island in the U.S. state of Georgia
- Cumberland Island (Saskatchewan), an island in Canadian province of Saskatchewan
- Cumberland Islands (Queensland), a group of islands in the Australian state of Queensland
- Cumberland Island horse

== See also ==
- Cumberland Island National Seashore
- South Cumberland Islands National Park
