= Phyllurus isis =

Conservation status
- Vulnerable (IUCN 3.1)

Scientific classification
- Kingdom: Animalia
- Phylum: Chordata
- Class: Reptilia
- Order: Squamata
- Suborder: Gekkota
- Family: Carphodactylidae
- Genus: Phyllurus
- Species: P. isis

Binomial name
- Phyllurus isis Couper, Covacevich & Moritz, 1993

Species of lizard

Phyllurus isis, also known commonly as the Mount Blackwood leaf-tailed gecko and the Mount Jukes broad-tailed gecko, is a species of gecko, a lizard in the family Carphodactylidae. The species is endemic to Mount Blackwood and Mount Jukes in mideastern Queensland, Australia.

== Etymology ==
The specific name, isis, refers to the ancient Egyptian goddess Isis.

== Habitat ==
The preferred natural habitat of P. isis is forest.

== Description ==
P. isis, which may attain a maximum snout-to-vent length (SVL) of 76 mm (3.0 in), is the smallest and least spiny species of Phyllurus.

== Reproduction ==
P. isis is oviparous.
