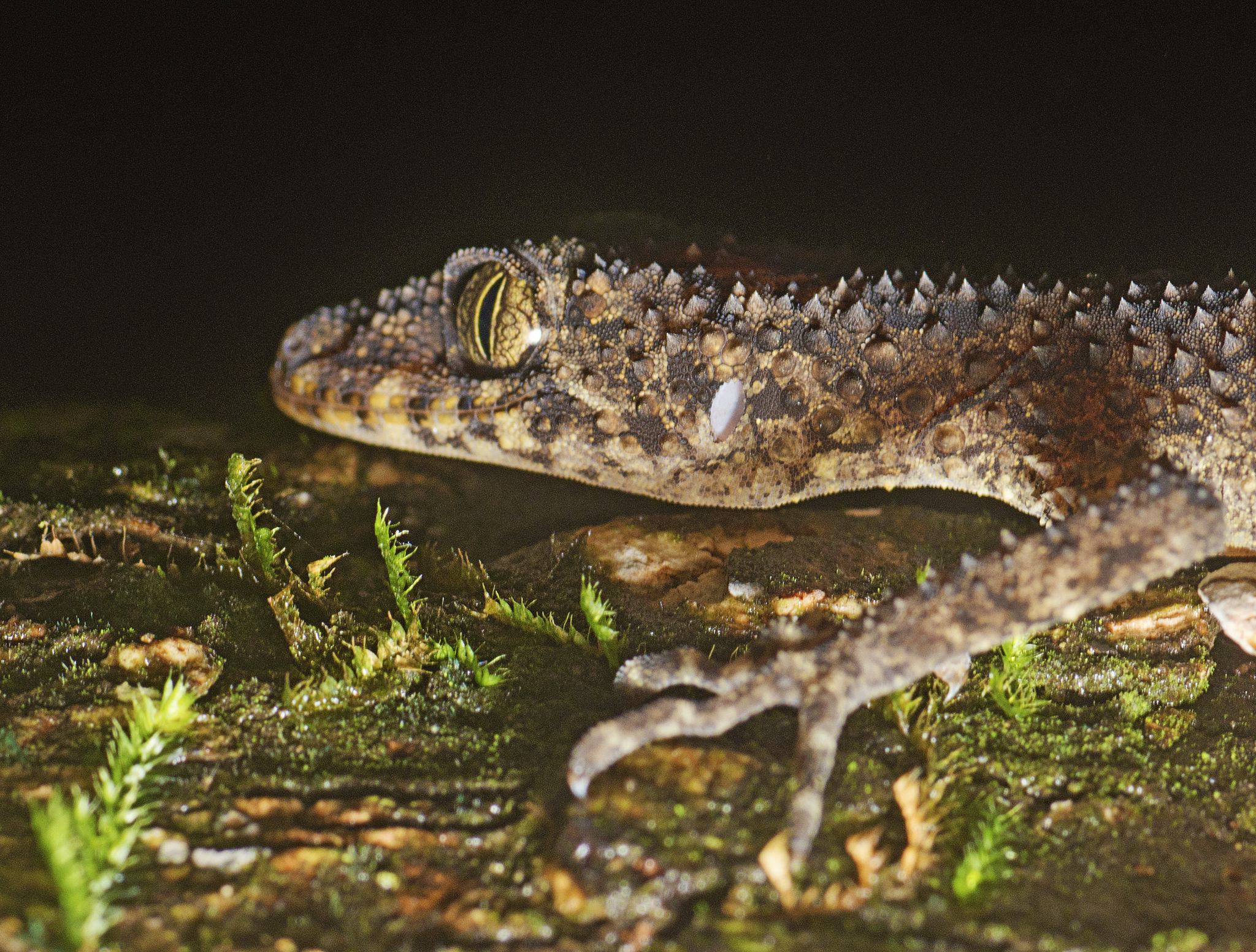

Conservation status
- Least Concern (IUCN 3.1)

Scientific classification
- Kingdom: Animalia
- Phylum: Chordata
- Class: Reptilia
- Order: Squamata
- Suborder: Gekkota
- Family: Carphodactylidae
- Genus: Phyllurus
- Species: P. nepthys

Binomial name
- Phyllurus nepthys Couper, Covacevich & Moritz, 1993

= Phyllurus nepthys =

Species of lizard

Phyllurus nepthys, also known commonly as the Eungella broad-tailed gecko and the Eungella leaf-tailed gecko, is a species of lizard in the family Carphodactylidae. The species is endemic to Australia.

== Etymology ==
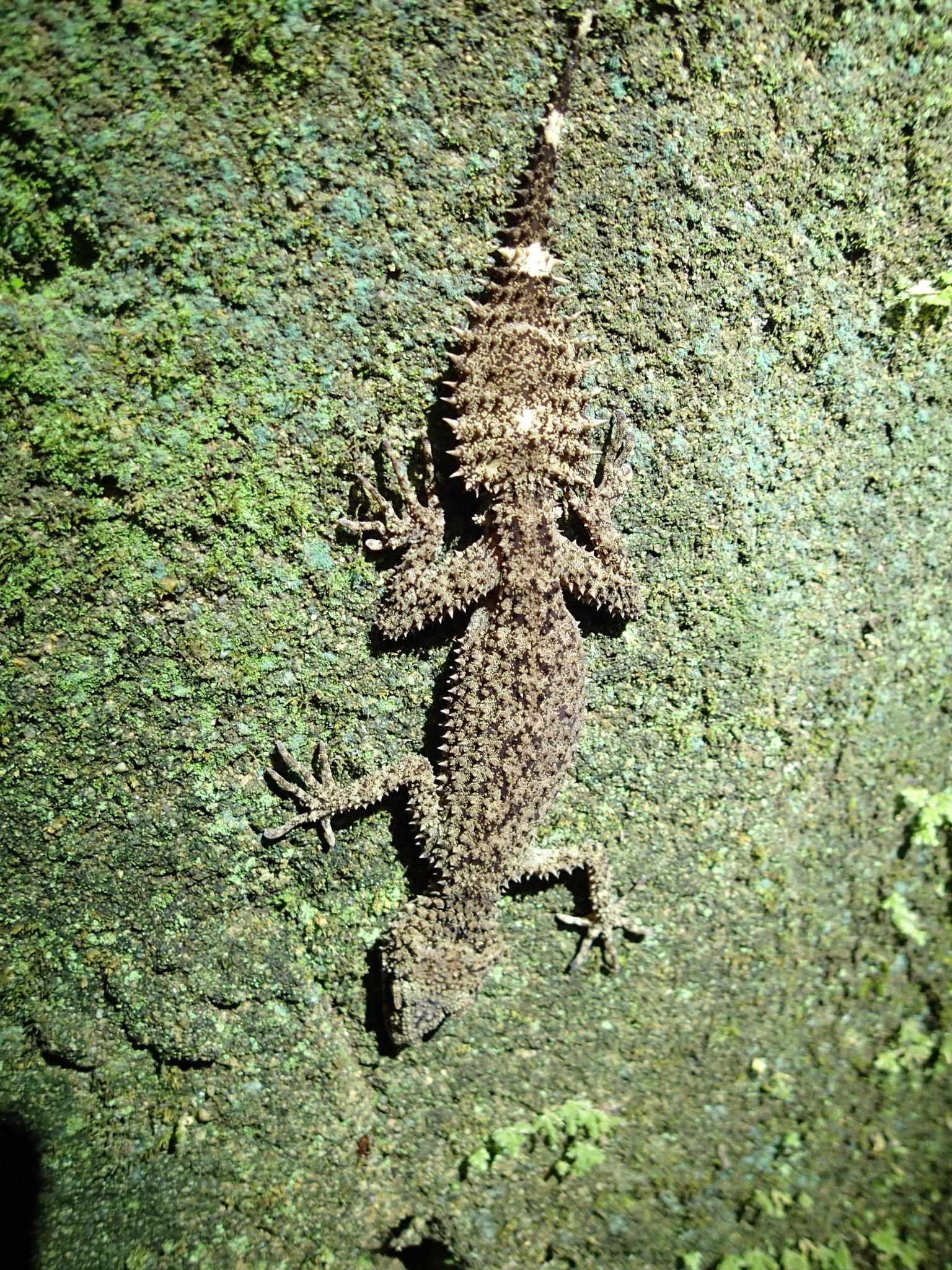
P. nepthys

The specific name, nepthys, refers to the ancient Egyptian goddess Nepthys.

== Geographic distribution ==
Phyllurus nepthys is found in the Clarke Range in mideastern Queensland, Australia.

== Habitat ==
The preferred natural habitat of Phyllurus nepthys is forest.

== Description ==
Phyllurus nepthys is very spinose. The underside (venter) is cream-colored, and is heavily peppered with brown. In all other species of Phyllurus the underside is mottled or unmarked. Maximum snout-to-vent length (SVL) is 10.3 cm (4.1 in).

== Reproduction ==
Phyllurus nepthys is oviparous.
