= Phyllurus ossa =

Scientific classification
- Kingdom: Animalia
- Phylum: Chordata
- Class: Reptilia
- Order: Squamata
- Suborder: Gekkota
- Family: Carphodactylidae
- Genus: Phyllurus
- Species: P. ossa

Binomial name
- Phyllurus ossa Couper, Covacevich, & Moritz, 1993

Species of lizard

Phyllurus ossa, also known as the Mackay Coast leaf-tailed gecko, is a gecko found in Australia. It is endemic to Mount Ossa National Park and Dryander National Park in mideastern Queensland.
