= Keswick Island =

Island in Queensland, Australia

Coordinates: 20°54′S 149°24′E

- Basil Bay
- Interactive map of Keswick Island

Geography
- Location: Coral Sea
- Archipelago: Cumberland Islands
- Total islands: 70
- Area: 5.3 km^{2} (2.0 sq mi)

Administration
- Australia
- State: Queensland
- Local government area: Mackay Regional Council
- Capital city: Basil Bay
- Largest settlement: Basil Bay (pop. 8)

Demographics
- Population: 96 (2014)
- Pop. density: 18.11/km^{2} (46.9/sq mi)

Additional information
- Official website: http://www.keswickisland.com.au/

Keswick Island is an island in the southern half of the Whitsunday Islands. Located 34 kilometres north-east of the Queensland city of Mackay, Keswick Island is part of the Cumberland Islands of islands that lay protected inside the waters of the Great Barrier Reef Marine Park.

The island is inhabited by a small number of residents. It is a semi-popular tourist destination set to expand with planned development. Visitors can stay in a small number of catered and self-catered accommodation. The island has its own airstrip and is accessible from Mackay Airport by a short plane flight or by private boat.

== History ==
=== Origin of the name ===
Identified as part of the Cumberland Isles Group by Captain James Cook in 1770. Keswick Island and neighbouring St Bees Island were first designated together as ‘L1 Island’ by Lieutenant Matthew Flinders, RN, in HMS Investigator in 1802.

Keswick Island was later individually named in 1879 after the town of Keswick in England's Cumbria Lake District by Staff Commander E. P. Bedwell, RN, in SS Llewellyn.

== Environs ==
Keswick Island is approximately 530 hectares (1300 acres) in area, with the majority being national park. It is part of the pristine Cumberland Group of islands that consists of St Bees Island, Keswick Island, Aspatria Island, Scawfell Island, Calder Island, Wigton Island and Cockermouth Island. The island is near to the South Cumberland Islands National Park. Neighbouring islands in the Cumberland Group are accessible by private boat. The nearest developed neighbouring island is Brampton Island some 7 km to the north.

Keswick Island is separated from its nearest neighbour, St Bees Island by only a few hundred metres by the Egremont Passage. The eucalypt woodlands of St Bees Island are occupied by a healthy koala colony currently being researched by Queensland universities to examine their equilibrium with their environment.

Ergmont Passage and St Bees Island

The island is located 360 km north of the Tropic of Capricorn. Temperatures vary from 17 °C to 24 °C in winter (water temperature is a steady 20 °C), and 24 °C to 30 °C in summer (water temperature is a steady 26 °C).

== Development ==
The overall land development lease area, which is situated in the north-eastern and eastern area of the Island, totals around 117 hectares and occupies over 4½ km of ocean front land. Resort complexes and residential housing capable of supporting a tourist and residential community are expected to be developed at some stage. The island already has some existing infrastructure such as an airstrip, sealed roads, communications services, and various utilities. The original development company was Transtate Pty Ltd who bought the head lease in 1995. The head lease changed hands in 2002 from Keswick Island Pty Ltd, and again in March 2008 to Keswick Developments Pty Ltd. In 2019, the head lease was bought by China Bloom (Hong Kong) Ltd (who later changed their name to Oasis Forest Ltd after the controversial media brought its attention to the public.)

Located in a World Heritage Site and being within the waters of the Great Barrier Reef Marine Park requires that building and construction is governed by environmental guidelines, detailed architectural and design codes to facilitate an eco-friendly development.

Development in the Whitsunday Islands is limited. Keswick Islands still remains relatively undeveloped. The island is inhabited by a small number of private residents and visitors. With more than 130 sub-leased land lots already established on ninety-nine year leasehold (through to the year 2096), the numbers of residents and tourism should be expected to grow significantly with any planned development.

== Activities ==
Visitors can undertake activities such as swimming, snorkeling, diving, fishing, beachcombing and bushwalking. Narrow walking tracks in the National Park wind through pockets of tropical rainforest to its beaches.

The island is fringed by colourful coral reefs and abundant marine life which provides favourable conditions for diving or snorkeling at mid-low tide. Three wrecks sites, including the protected historic wreck sites of The Singapore (a two master sail and steam vessel) and The Llewellyn (a former coastal steamer) are accessible from the island within a few minutes by boat.

Whales can be frequently seen around the island during their annual migration through the Whitsundays between July and September.

== Transport ==
The closest transport hub is the city of Mackay. The island has its own sealed airstrip and was accessible from the old side of Mackay Airport on a short 10-minute flight with Keswick Development Pty Ltd's charter airline, Island Air (now defunct). It is also accessible from Mackay Harbour via chartered or private boat. Greaton Developments, China Bloom's management company, currently have a ferry named Keswick Explorer operating on most Mondays and Fridays depending on weather conditions. Moorings are available in Horseshoe Bay. Whitsunday Helicopters provide limited air services, whilst local Mackay based airline Horizon Airways (the only approved fixed wing air transport service) provides regular fixed wing transportation from the mainland. Private and other Commercial aircraft are currently not permitted to land on Keswick Island for safety reasons.

Transport around the island is restricted to electric golf buggies.

== Accommodation ==
Self-catered holiday homes are available for short-term rental.

=== Sale ===
While most of the island is designated as National Park, the islands head-lease (117 hectares) was sold to a Sydney property consortium in January 2008. Planned developments are said to include villas, condominiums, cafes and shops but never eventuated. Work on a deep-water jetty and improved barge ramps is expected to commence in the future to improve access to the island but hasn't been confirmed at this stage. Residents are still waiting for the head lease holders to build a jetty to improve the appalling access conditions currently faced. The new owners plan to develop the islands residential and eco-tourism potential in a sustainable and environmentally friendly manner.

== Gallery ==
Residential Precinct

Connie Bay

Basil Bay

Basil Bay

Residential Precinct

== Controversy ==
In 2020, it was reported that residents were engaged in a dispute with developer China Bloom, which obtained the main lease to the island in May 2019.

== See also ==
- List of islands of Australia
