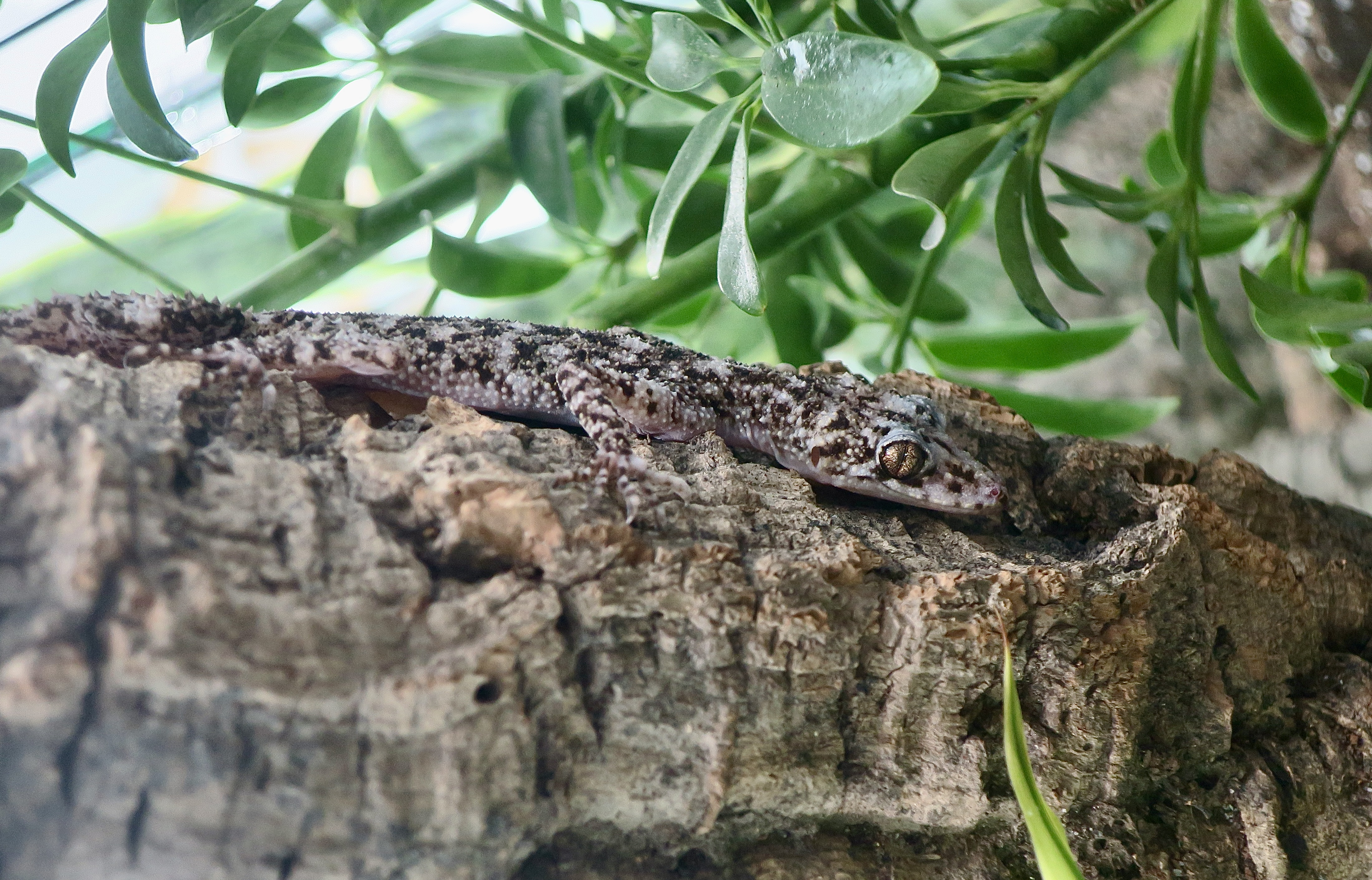

Scientific classification
- Kingdom: Animalia
- Phylum: Chordata
- Class: Reptilia
- Order: Squamata
- Suborder: Gekkota
- Family: Carphodactylidae
- Genus: Phyllurus
- Species: P. amnicola

Binomial name
- Phyllurus amnicola Couper, Schneider, Hoskin & Covacevich, 2000

Synonyms
- Riverine leaf-tailed gecko

= Phyllurus amnicola =

Mount Elliot leaf-tailed gecko

Species of lizard

Phyllurus amnicola, also known as the Mount Elliot leaf-tailed gecko or the Riverine leaf-tailed gecko, is a species of gecko found in Australia. It is endemic to Mount Elliot in Bowling Green Bay National Park in northeastern Queensland.

== Description ==
P. amnicola are beige or white in color with dark splotches and/or stripes running crosswise on their body. The limbs of P. amnicola are usually banded with the base color getting lighter as it proceeds ventrally, with the bands becoming more frequent. The "leaf-tailed" name comes from the tail, which resembles a leaf and has a long knob-like tip, and from the compressed morphology of the body. This compressed morphology allows the gecko to lie flat against boulders and rocks. The limbs are long and have large distally compressed digits. It has been observed that regrown tails are not as bright as the original. P. amnicola is distinguished from congeners by its larger size, flared instead of cylindrical tail shape, and by the anterior-most dark band being broken but spanning the full width of the tail.

== Distribution and habitat ==
Phyllurus amnicola have a very limited natural range and are considered microendemic. They are only found along the streams and creeks of Mt. Elliot in Queensland between 400-1000m elevation. The type locality for this gecko is Alligator Creek. Almost all specimens have been seen on rocks or boulders just above the water line with their head towards the water. The one recorded exception to this was a specimen on a tree trunk in between two boulders, just above the water line. Foraging occurs near turbulent or flowing water, so this is hypothesized to be why the geckos are always found in this location and in the head down position.

== Reproduction ==
There is little available information on this species' reproduction beyond it likely reproduces in a similar manner to its Phyllurus congeners. In 2000, Couper, et al. recorded that in 14 collected mature female specimens, 8 carried between one and three shelled eggs. There are some private and commercial breeders attempting to breed this species for the exotic pet trade. This is notable because nearly all native Australian reptiles are illegal to export for the pet trade.

== Etymology ==
"Amnicola" translates from Latin to English as: "dwelling by a river". This is a reference to the type locality specimen for P. amnicola.
