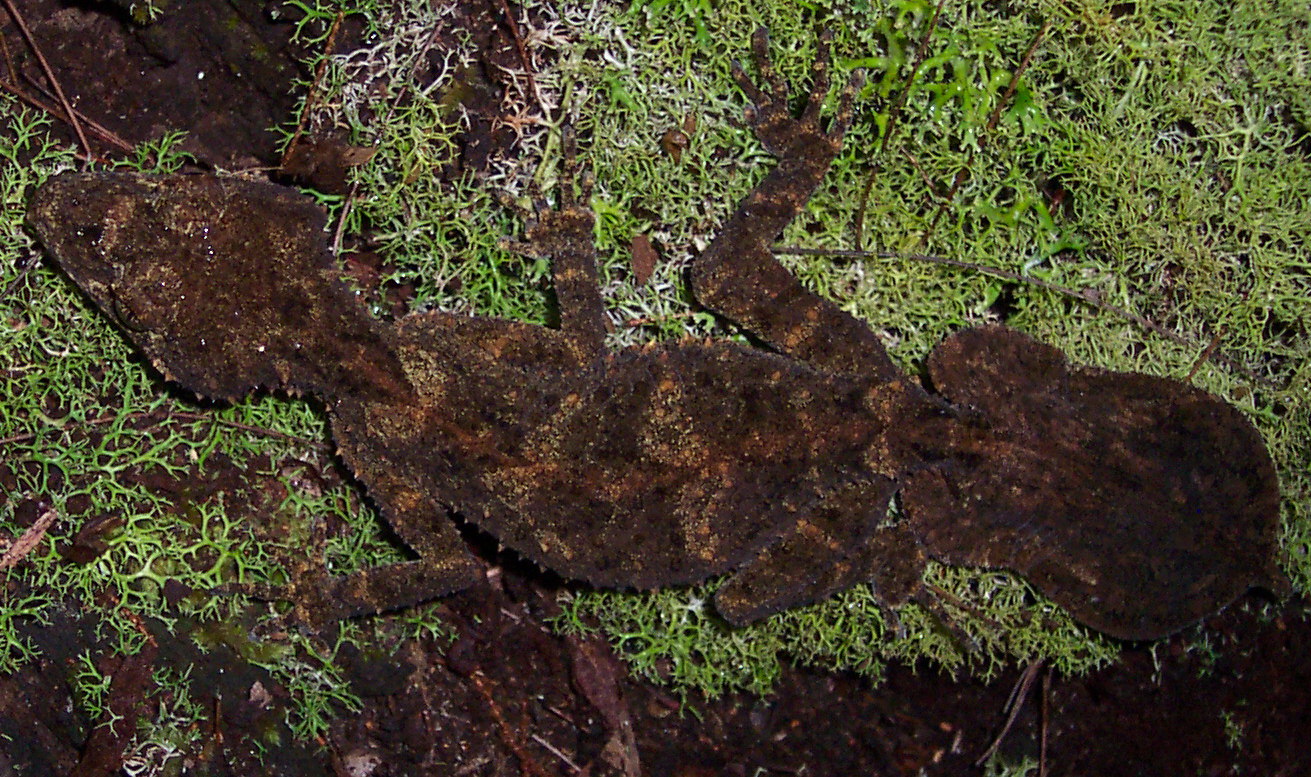
- Saltuarius swaini in Myall Lakes National Park.

Scientific classification
- Kingdom: Animalia
- Phylum: Chordata
- Class: Reptilia
- Order: Squamata
- Suborder: Gekkota
- Family: Carphodactylidae
- Genus: Saltuarius; Couper, Covacevich & Moritz, 1993

= Saltuarius =

Genus of lizards

Saltuarius is a genus of larger Australian geckos, known collectively as leaf-tailed geckos.

== Taxonomy ==
The genus Saltuarius was created in 1993 to accommodate some former members of the genus Phyllurus. These geckos appear very similar to the Uroplatus geckos native to Madagascar. However, this is a convergent evolution.

== Etymology ==
The genus name is derived from the Latin word saltuarius, meaning "keeper of the forest".

== Habitat and distribution ==
The species in the genus Saltuarius inhabit Australia's eastern coastal region, a vegetation composed of rainforests and dry Eucalyptus forests. Saltuarius cornutus and Saltuarius swaini are arboreal geckos, the remaining species live on rocky outcrops. They all need a high level of relative air humidity. The species from southern regions must hibernate for several months at temperatures varying between 8 °C (46 °F) and 15 °C (59 °F).

== Reproduction ==
These species invariably lay soft-shelled eggs which are buried in humid substrates.

== Species ==
The following seven species are recognized as being valid.

- Saltuarius cornutus (Ogilby, 1892) – northern leaf-tailed gecko
- Saltuarius eximius Hoskin & Couper, 2013 – Cape Melville leaf-tailed gecko
- Saltuarius kateae Couper et al., 2008 – Kate's leaf-tailed gecko
- Saltuarius moritzi Couper et al., 2008 – Moritz's leaf-tailed gecko
- Saltuarius salebrosus (Covacevich, 1975) – rough-throated leaf-tailed gecko
- Saltuarius swaini (Wells & Wellington, 1985) – southern leaf-tailed gecko
- Saltuarius wyberba Couper, Schneider & Covacevich, 1997 – granite leaf-tailed gecko

The former Saltuarius occultus Couper, Covacevich & Moritz, 1993, the long-necked northern leaf-tailed gecko, is now Orraya occultus.

Nota bene: A binomial authority in parentheses indicates that the species was originally described in a genus other than Saltuarius.
