= Kabikabi =

Kabikabi may be,

- Kabikabi people, Australia
  - Kabikabi language, Australia
- Phyllurus kabikabi, sp. gecko
