= Phyllurus gulbaru =

Conservation status
- Endangered (IUCN 3.1)

Scientific classification
- Kingdom: Animalia
- Phylum: Chordata
- Class: Reptilia
- Order: Squamata
- Suborder: Gekkota
- Family: Carphodactylidae
- Genus: Phyllurus
- Species: P. gulbaru

Binomial name
- Phyllurus gulbaru Hoskin, Couper, & Schneider, 2003

Species of lizard

Phyllurus gulbaru, the Gulbaru leaf-tailed gecko, is a species of gecko found in Australia. It is endemic to the extreme southern end of the Paluma Range in Queensland.
