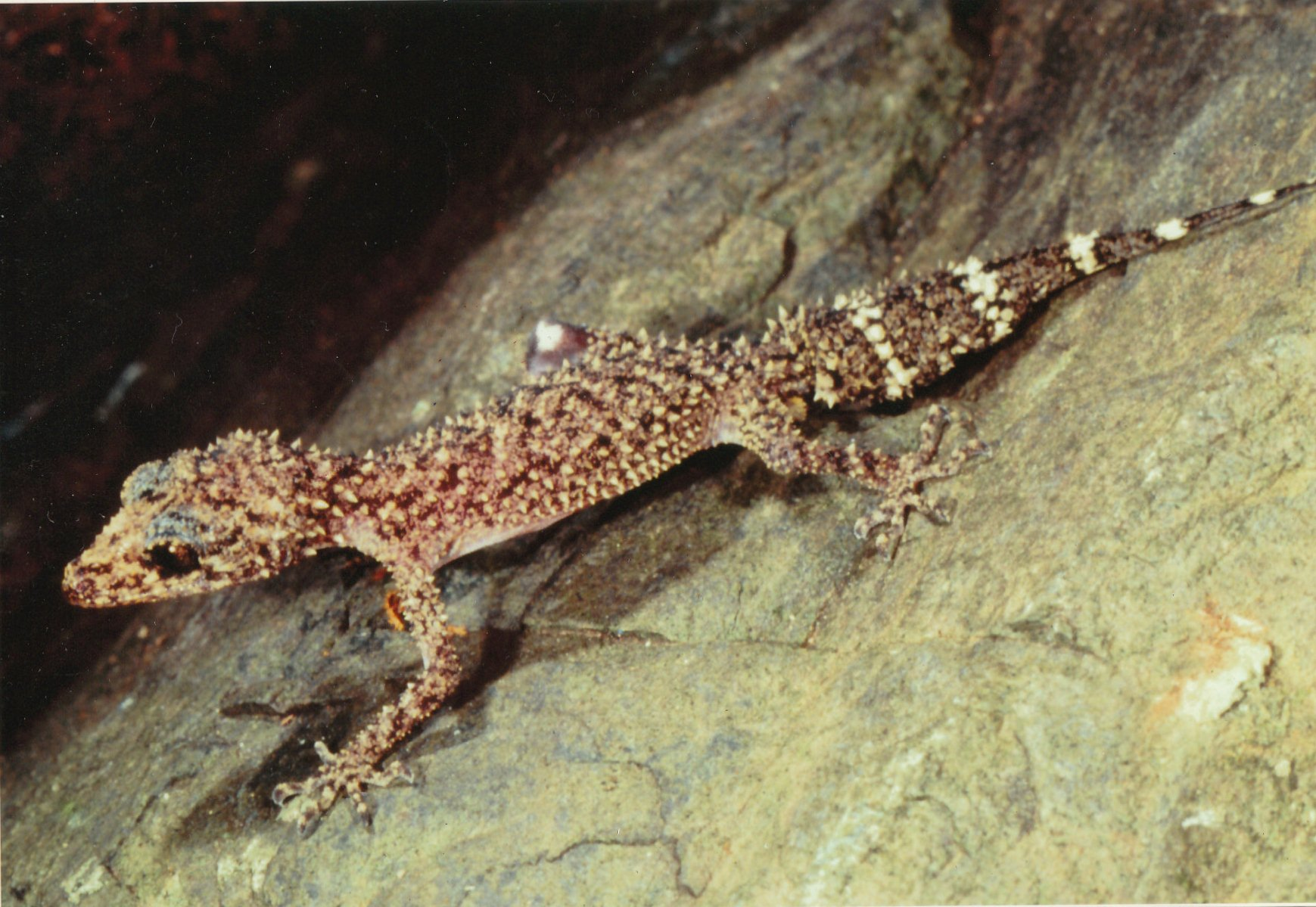

Conservation status
- Near Threatened (IUCN 3.1)

Scientific classification
- Kingdom: Animalia
- Phylum: Chordata
- Class: Reptilia
- Order: Squamata
- Suborder: Gekkota
- Family: Carphodactylidae
- Genus: Phyllurus
- Species: P. championae

Binomial name
- Phyllurus championae Couper, C. Schneider, Hoskin & Covacevich, 2000

= Champion's leaf-tailed gecko =

Species of lizard

Champion's leaf-tailed gecko (Phyllurus championae), also known commonly as the Koumala leaf-tailed gecko, is a species of gecko, a lizard in the family Carphodactylidae. The species is endemic to Australia.

== Etymology ==
The specific name, championae (genitive, feminine), is in honor of Australian zoologist Irene Champion, a Resource Ranger with the Queensland Parks and Wildlife Service.

== Geographic range ==
P. championae was first found in the Cameron Creek/Black Mountain area near Koumala, Queensland, Australia.

== Habitat ==
The preferred natural habitat of P. championae is forest with rocky areas.

== Description ==
P. championae may attain a snout-to-vent length (SVL) of 8 cm (3.1 in).

== Reproduction ==
P. championae is oviparous.
