= Saltuarius wyberba =

Scientific classification
- Domain: Eukaryota
- Kingdom: Animalia
- Phylum: Chordata
- Class: Reptilia
- Order: Squamata
- Infraorder: Gekkota
- Family: Carphodactylidae
- Genus: Saltuarius
- Species: S. wyberba

Binomial name
- Saltuarius wyberba Couper, Schneider & Covacevich, 1997

Species of lizard

Saltuarius wyberba, also known as the granite leaf-tailed gecko, is a gecko found in Australia. It is endemic to southeastern Queensland and northern New South Wales.
