= Cumberland Islands (Queensland) =

Group of islands off the coast of Australia

The Cumberland Islands form a group of 70 islands at 20°34′S 149°08′E on the Great Barrier Reef, off the coast of Mackay in Queensland, Australia. They were discovered by Captain James Cook in 1770.

In 1770 James Cook (then a lieutenant in the Royal Navy) in HMS Endeavour sailed past the coast off what is now the city of Mackay. After travelling north for a further two days, in his journal for Monday 4 June he recorded that he named the body of water through which he sailed Whitsunday's Passage "… as it was discovered on the day the Church commemorates that Festival" and called the islands in the area "Cumberland Isles in honour of His Royal Highness the Duke of Cumberland" (Henry Frederick, the brother of King George III of Great Britain).

In giving the name, Cook gave no firm indication which islands in the area were encompassed, but his chart showed the name covering islands as far south as St Bees Island and Keswick Island, and Hayman Island to the north. More detailed charts by those following Cook showed likewise. Over time "Isles" has been replaced by "Islands". More recently these islands have increasingly become known as the Whitsunday Islands, and the general area more simply as the "Whitsundays".

The Cumberland Islands were grouped into the Whitsunday Group, the Lindeman Group, the Anchor Islands, the Sir James Smith Group and the South Cumberland Islands National Park.

== See also ==
- List of islands of Australia
- Protected areas of Queensland
