= Phyllurus pinnaclensis =

Scientific classification
- Kingdom: Animalia
- Phylum: Chordata
- Class: Reptilia
- Order: Squamata
- Suborder: Gekkota
- Family: Carphodactylidae
- Genus: Phyllurus
- Species: P. pinnaclensis

Binomial name
- Phyllurus pinnaclensis Hoskin, Bertola & Higgie, 2019

Species of lizard

Phyllurus pinnaclensis, also known as the Pinnacles leaf-tailed gecko, is a species of geckos found in Queensland in Australia.
