= Phyllurus caudiannulatus =

Conservation status
- Near Threatened (IUCN 3.1)

Scientific classification
- Kingdom: Animalia
- Phylum: Chordata
- Class: Reptilia
- Order: Squamata
- Suborder: Gekkota
- Family: Carphodactylidae
- Genus: Phyllurus
- Species: P. caudiannulatus

Binomial name
- Phyllurus caudiannulatus Covacevich, 1975

Species of reptile

Phyllurus caudiannulatus, also known as the Bulburin leaf-tailed gecko or ringed thin-tail gecko, is a gecko found in Australia. It is endemic to the Bulburin State Forest in the Dawes Range and Many Peaks Range in southeastern Queensland. Although the genus Phyllurus was originally defined to include four species—P. platurus, P. milli, P. cornutus, and P. sphyrurus—further research and new discoveries have expanded the genus to include additional species, such as Phyllurus caudiannulatus, which shares the leaf-tailed gecko characteristics of the group. Phyllurus caudiannulatus uniquely features a slender, cylindrical tail, setting it apart within the genus.
