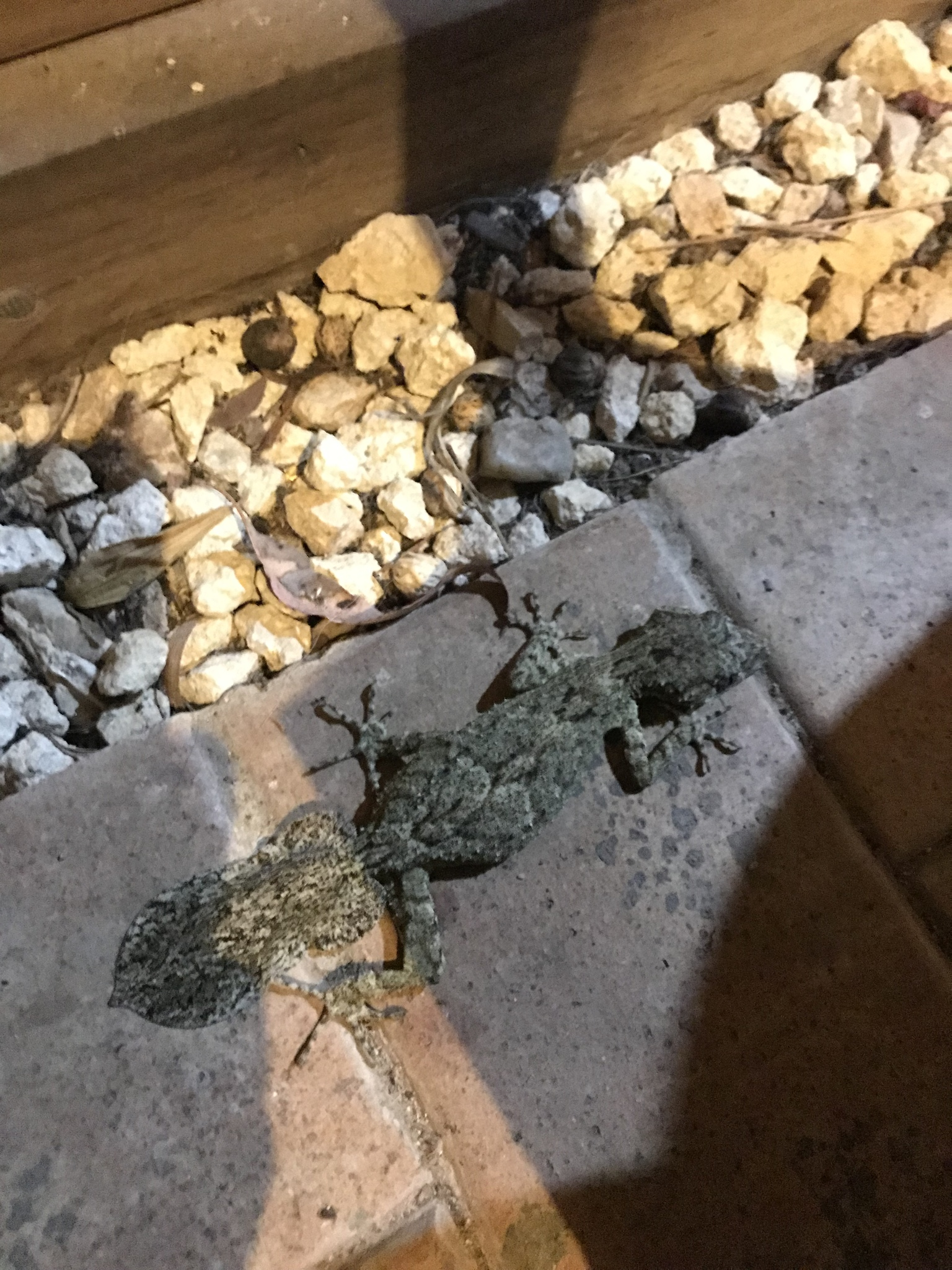

Conservation status
- Least Concern (IUCN 3.1)

Scientific classification
- Kingdom: Animalia
- Phylum: Chordata
- Class: Reptilia
- Order: Squamata
- Suborder: Gekkota
- Family: Carphodactylidae
- Genus: Saltuarius
- Species: S. moritzi

Binomial name
- Saltuarius moritzi Couper, Sadlier, Shea & Wilmer, 2008

= Saltuarius moritzi =

Species of lizard

Saltuarius moritzi, also known commonly as the New England leaf-tailed gecko or Moritz's leaf-tailed gecko, is a species of lizard in the family Carphodactylidae. The species is native to Australia.

== Etymology ==
The specific name, moritzi, is in honor of Australian herpetologist Craig Moritz.

== Description ==
Adults of Saltuarius moritzi usually have a snout-to-vent length (SVL) of about 11 cm (4.3 in). The rostral contacts the nostrils. There are large spinose tubercles on the upper surface of the digits. The coloration is extremely variable.

== Geographic range ==
Saltuarius moritzi is endemic to the New England Tablelands in New South Wales.

== Habitat ==
The preferred natural habitats of S. moritzi are closed forests, wet sclerophyll forests, and rocky escarpments, gorges, and outcrops.

== Description ==
Saltuarius moritzi may attain a snout-to-vent length (SVL) of 10.9 cm (4.3 in).

== Reproduction ==
Saltuarius moritzi is oviparous.
