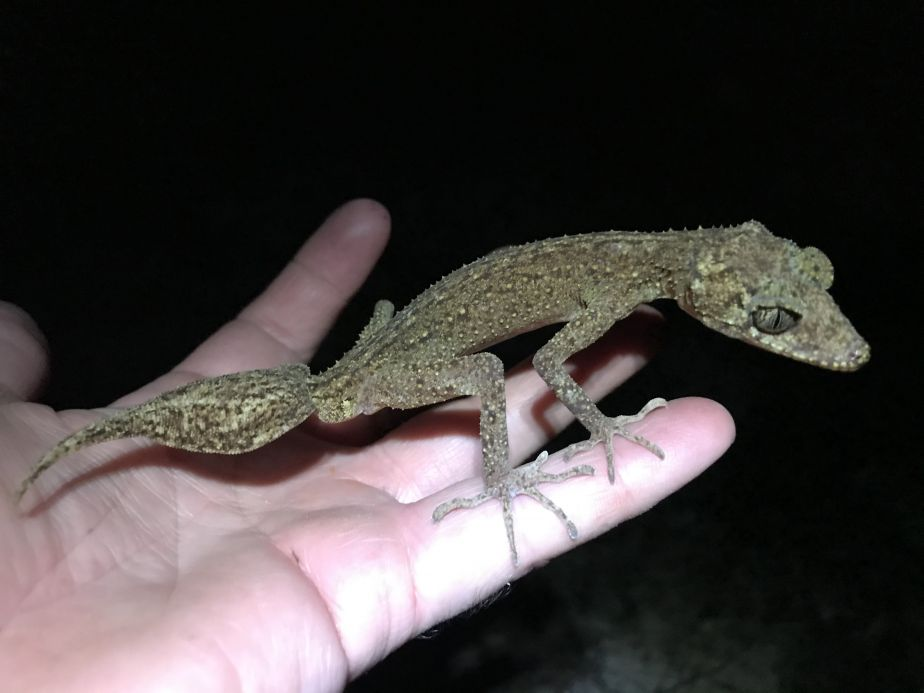

Scientific classification
- Kingdom: Animalia
- Phylum: Chordata
- Class: Reptilia
- Order: Squamata
- Suborder: Gekkota
- Family: Carphodactylidae
- Genus: Phyllurus
- Species: P. fimbriatus

Binomial name
- Phyllurus fimbriatus Hoskin 2023

= Scawfell Island leaf-tailed gecko =

Species of lizard

Phyllurus fimbriatus, the Scawfell Island leaf-tailed gecko, is a large species of gecko endemic to mid-east Queensland, Australia.

Initially discovered during a survey of Scawfell Island from the 16th - 19th of November 2021, this species was officially documented by Dr Conrad Hoskin in early 2023.

== Description ==
Phyllurus fimbriatus is a large gecko with a pointed, "beaky" head, a slender body, and a leaf-like tail. The dorsal colouration ranges from grey to tan, with irregular large dark brown blotches on the neck and body, and smaller, dark brown blotches on head and limbs. The ventral colouration is a cream colour, with dark blotches around the knees, arms, and legs. The original tail has 6 distinct white banding patterns, with the band closest to the body forming a "V" shape. However, if the tail is lost, the white banding does not re-appear on the regrown tail.

Much of the body and tail is covered in small spines, with slightly larger spines appearing on the lateral sides of the lizard. Adult males range in body size from 9.6 cm - 10.5 cm, while adult females are slightly larger, ranging from 10.3 cm - 11.3cm (excluding the length of the tail). Limbs are long and very slender, with spindly, elongated toes for gripping rock surfaces.

== Habitat ==
Phyllurus fimbriatus is endemic to Scawfell Island, an uninhabited island approximately 50km west of Mackay, Queensland. This species is found only in deeply layered granite rock and boulder formations. Surveys of other habitat types on the island, such as rainforest vegetation along the slopes of the island, did not find any presence of Phyllurus fimbriatus.

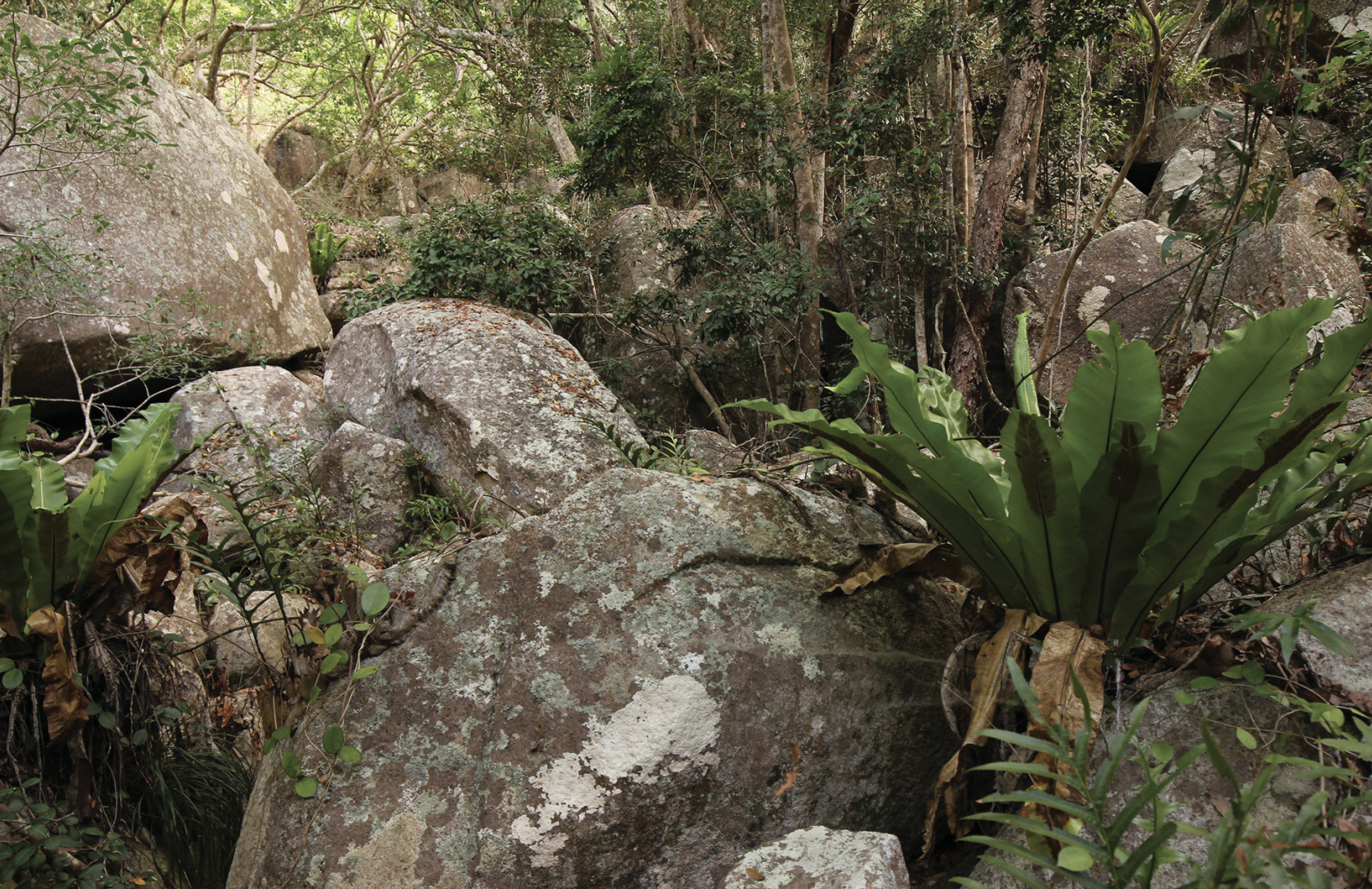
Habitat of Phyllurus fimbriatus

== Behaviour ==
Though little is currently known about the behaviour of this gecko, it was noted that the species can be seen on rock surfaces at night, and likely retreats into the crevices of rocks and boulders during the day.
