= Phyllurus kabikabi =

Scientific classification
- Kingdom: Animalia
- Phylum: Chordata
- Class: Reptilia
- Order: Squamata
- Suborder: Gekkota
- Family: Carphodactylidae
- Genus: Phyllurus
- Species: P. kabikabi

Binomial name
- Phyllurus kabikabi Couper, Hamley, & Hoskin, 2008

Species of lizard

Phyllurus kabikabi, also known as the Oakview leaf-tailed gecko, is a gecko found in Australia. It is endemic to Oakview National Park in Queensland.
