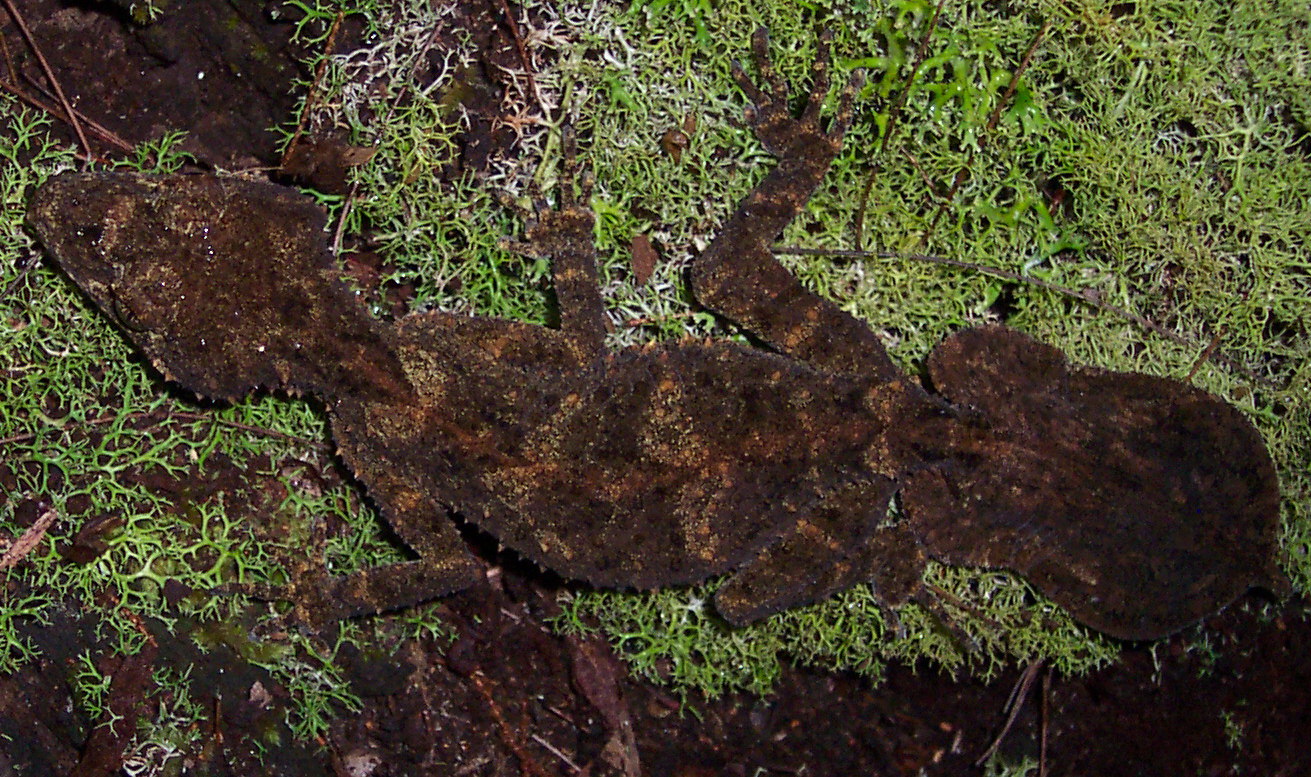

Conservation status
- Least Concern (IUCN 3.1)

Scientific classification
- Kingdom: Animalia
- Phylum: Chordata
- Class: Reptilia
- Order: Squamata
- Suborder: Gekkota
- Family: Carphodactylidae
- Genus: Saltuarius
- Species: S. swaini

Binomial name
- Saltuarius swaini Wells & Wellington, 1985

= Saltuarius swaini =

Species of lizard

Saltuarius swaini, also known as the southern leaf-tailed gecko or Border Ranges leaf-tailed gecko, is endemic to Australia where it is found in coastal mountain ranges of southeastern Queensland and northern New South Wales. It inhabits rainforests and lives inside large tree root systems and hollows of strangler figs. Its scientific name is after Malcolm Swain of the NSW National Parks & Wildlife Service.

== Description ==
Southern leaf tailed geckos are a light to dark brown colour with darker patterns. The gecko is approx. 134 mm (5.3 in) long from snout to vent.

Their tails are broad and leaf-life hence their common name. When threatened or caught geckos can drop their tail to confuse predators. Eventually a new tail will be regenerated, although only the original tail will have the tubercules and matching colour and pattern to the torso; new tails will be very different in both colour and pattern.

== Life cycle ==
Female southern leaf-tailed geckos usually lay one or two soft-shelled eggs in late spring. These eggs are up to 28 mm in length. The eggs are buried in moist soil or leaf litter to prevent their drying out. Left to develop unattended, 3 months later the offspring hatch and begin fending for themselves, catching insects within only a few days of birth. They take up to two years to fully mature and then can survive for up to eight more years.

== Diet ==
The southern leaf-tailed gecko eats mostly insects.
