= Aspatria Island =

Island in Queensland, Australia

- Location within Australia

Geography
- Location: Queensland
- Coordinates: 20.93139°S 149.46778°E

Administration
- Australia

Aspatria Island is an island in the Coral Sea, off the coast of the Mackay Region, Queensland, Australia. It is 37.4 kilometres (23.2 mi) NE of Mackay and 809 kilometres (503 mi) NNW of Brisbane.
