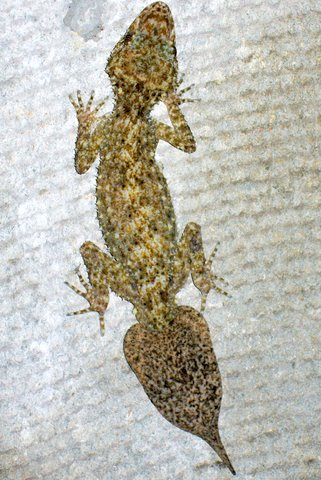
- in a garage at Chatswood West, Australia

Scientific classification
- Domain: Eukaryota
- Kingdom: Animalia
- Phylum: Chordata
- Class: Reptilia
- Order: Squamata
- Infraorder: Gekkota
- Family: Carphodactylidae
- Genus: Phyllurus
- Species: P. platurus

Binomial name
- Phyllurus platurus Shaw 1790

Synonyms
- Lacerta platura; Stellio phyllurus; Stellio platurus; Stellio platuros; Agama grandoculis; Agama platyura; Agama discosura; Geckoides platurus; Phyllurus platura; Phyllurus spinosus; Phyllurus novaehollandiae; Phyllurus cuvieri; Phyllurus whitii; Phyllurus australis; Phyllurus inermis; Phyllura discosura; Phyllura grandoculis; Gymnodactylus platyurus; Gymnodactylus phyllurus; Gymnodactylus inermis; Gymnodactylus platurus; Cyrtodactylus platura; Gecko platycaudus

= Broad-tailed gecko =

Species of lizard

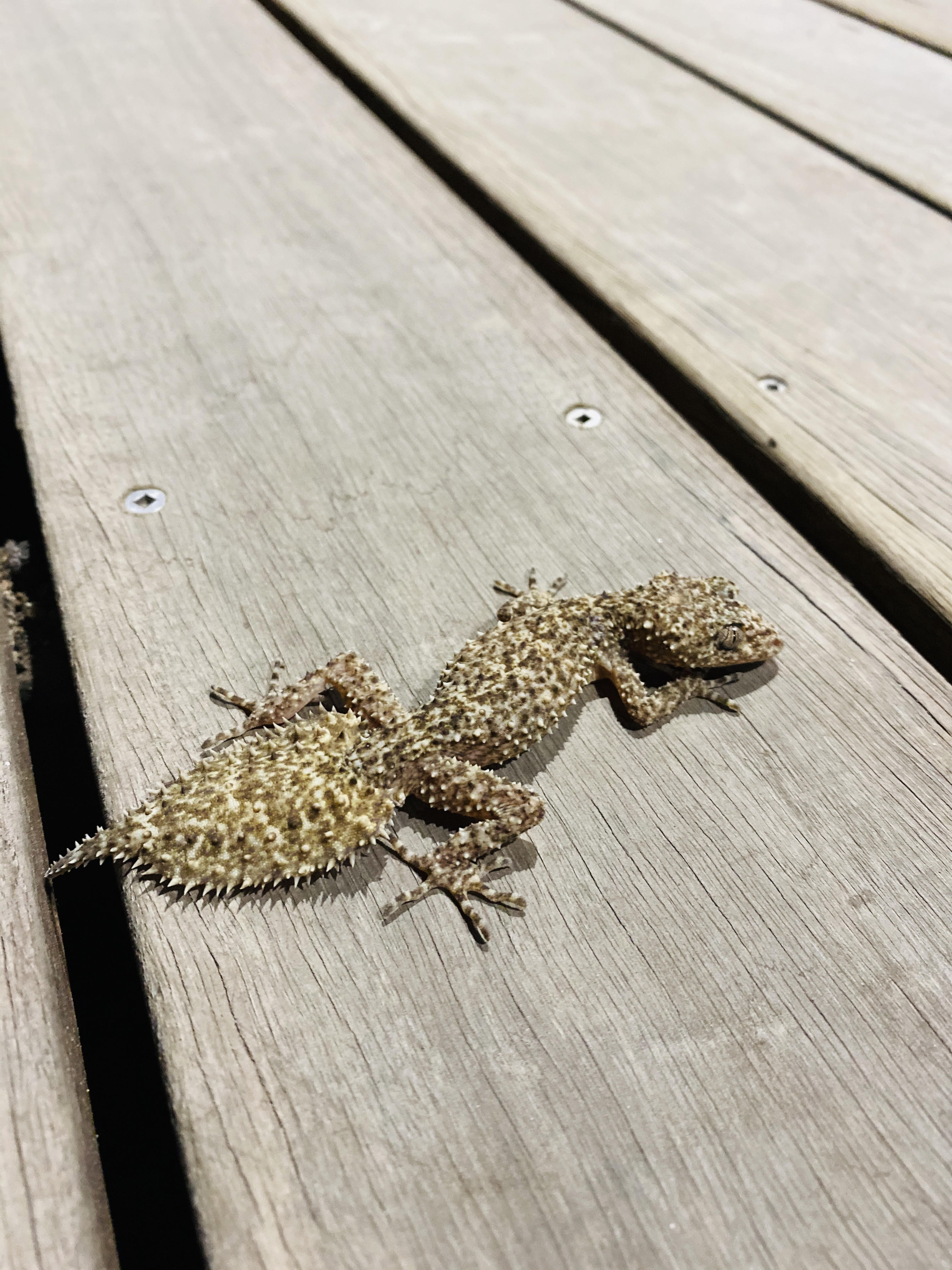
Taken in East Ryde

The broad-tailed gecko, southern leaf-tailed gecko, or Sydney leaf-tailed gecko (Phyllurus platurus) is a common gecko of the family Carphodactylidae found in the Sydney Basin. The species uses its mottled colour to camouflage against bark or rock, and if threatened can drop its large fleshy tail as a decoy. The tail is also useful for fat storage. This species of gecko is available in captivity as a pet, they are a nocturnal ambush hunter, relying on camouflage and patience to catch prey. Primary prey items include large nocturnal invertebrates such as spiders, cockroaches and beetles.

== Description ==
Snout to vent length of 9.5 cm. Total length up to 15 cm. Mottled brown in colour with low bumpy tubercules over the body, original tails are mottled the same colour as the body with large slightly spiny tubercules, whereas regenerated tails are chunkier mottled and smooth.

== Habitat ==
Common generally in the greater Sydney Basin area, north to Newcastle and south to the Illawarra. It mainly inhabits rocky areas including boulders, rock faces or small rock crevices, but can also naturally be found on trees including in areas with no immediate rocky habitat. The species can occupy a wide range of niches from temperate rainforest gullies to drier sclerophyll ridge lines. It has also adapted well to human structures and can be found in garages, fences, retaining walls and homes.

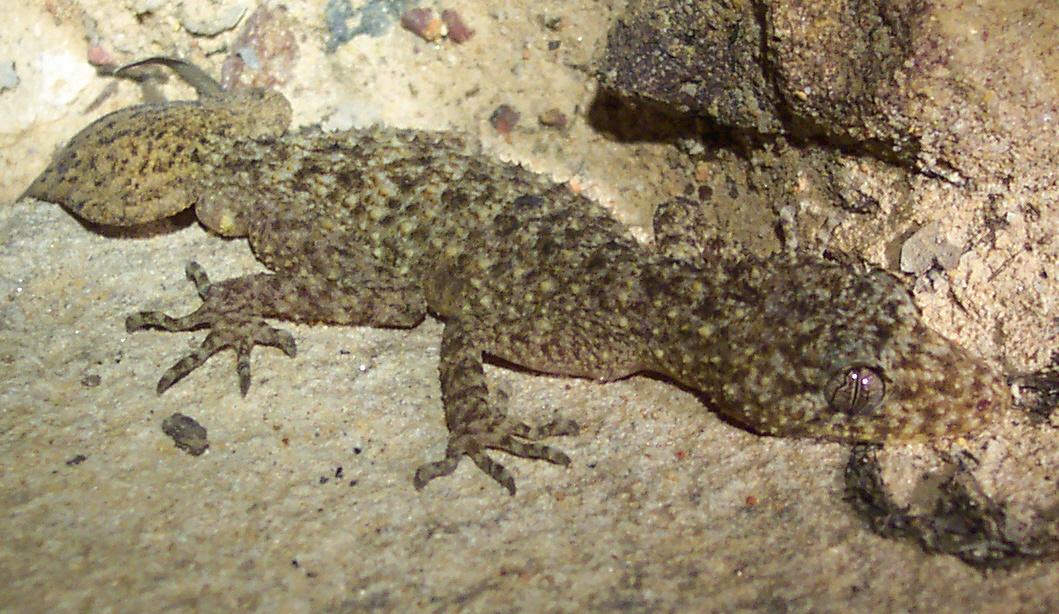
in Sydney

== Diet ==
Arthropods such as spiders, moths, beetles and cockroaches.

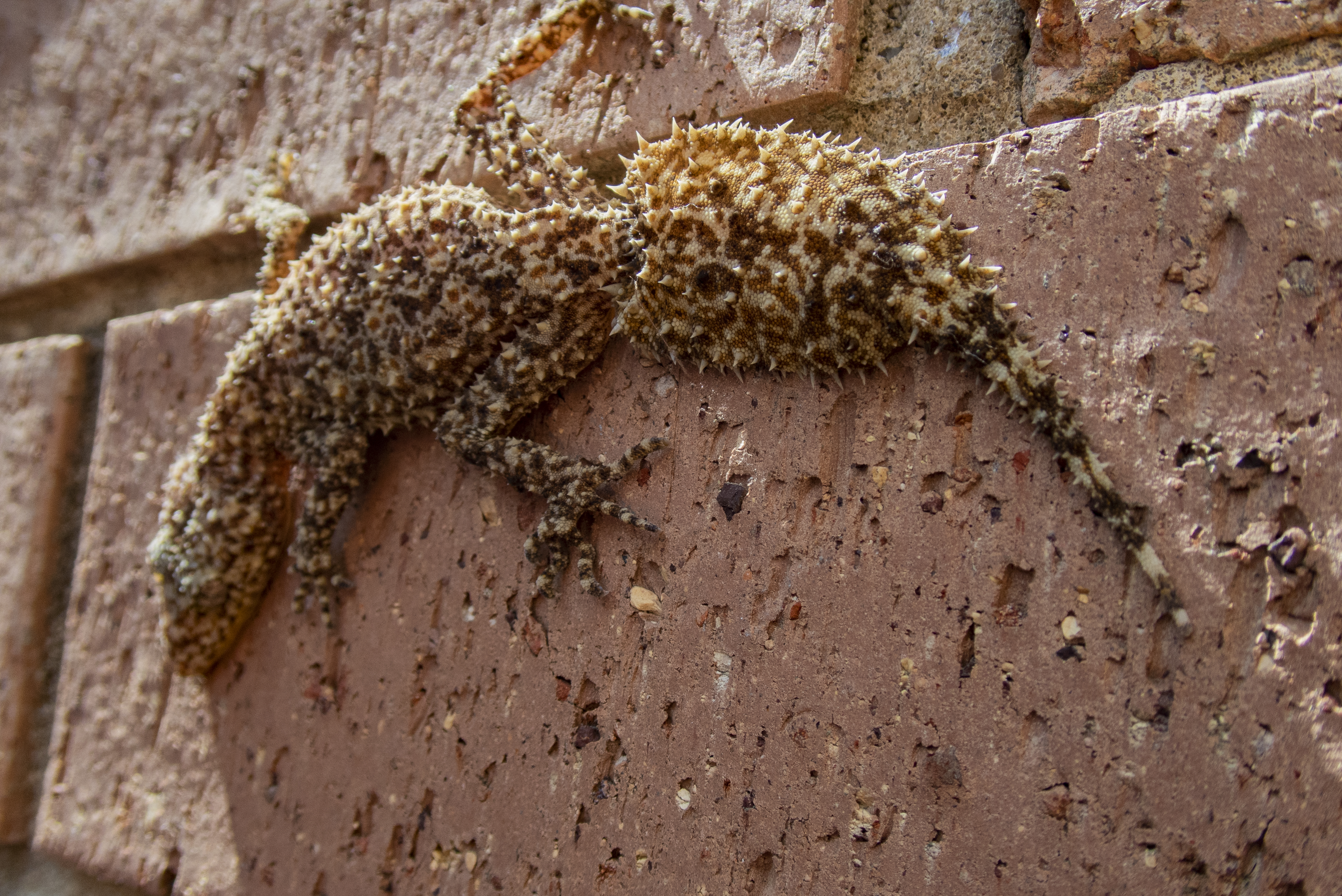
Broad-tailed Gecko - tail

== Reproduction ==
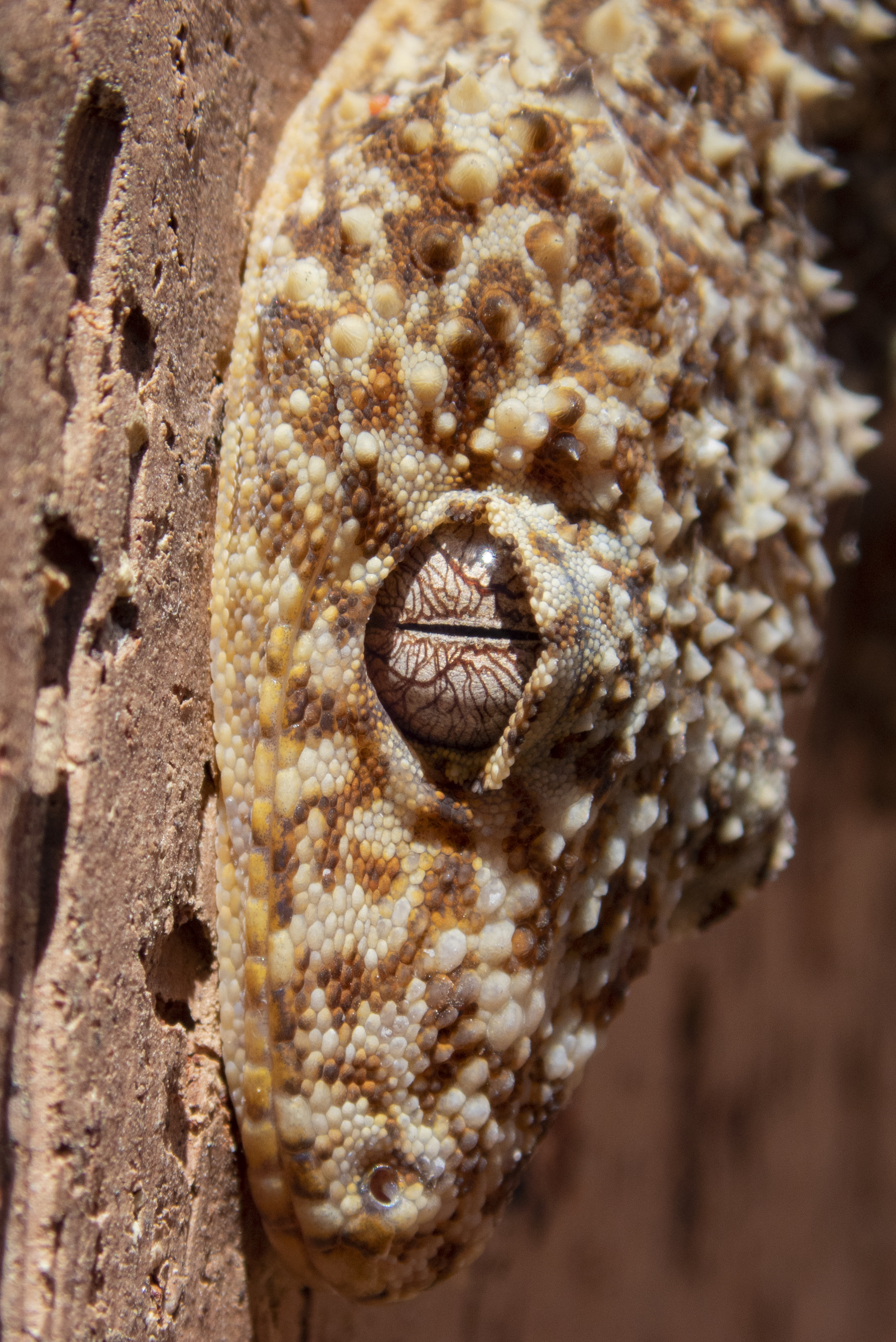
Taken in Sydney's Northern Beaches

One or two eggs per clutch, laid in a crevice. Juveniles hatch after eight to ten weeks.

== Captivity ==
Considered an "easy to keep" species, a license is required to keep the Southern leaf-tailed gecko as a pet in Australia, though licenses may differ from state to state.
