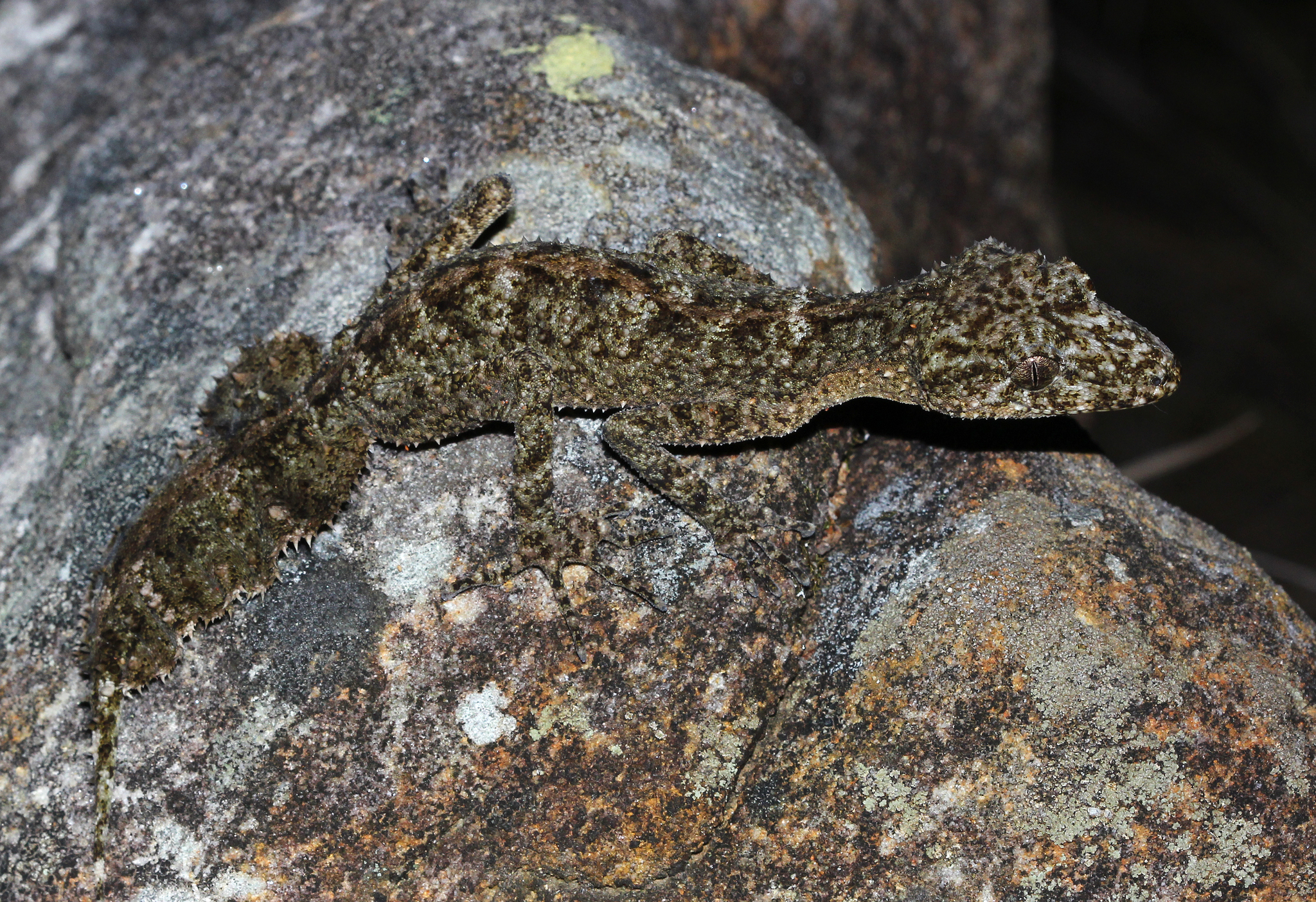
- In Northern New South Wales in 2014

Conservation status
- Least Concern (IUCN 3.1)

Scientific classification
- Kingdom: Animalia
- Phylum: Chordata
- Class: Reptilia
- Order: Squamata
- Suborder: Gekkota
- Family: Carphodactylidae
- Genus: Saltuarius
- Species: S. kateae

Binomial name
- Saltuarius kateae Couper, Sadlier, Shea, & Worthington Wilmer, 2008

= Saltuarius kateae =

Species of lizard

Saltuarius kateae, also known commonly as Kate's leaf-tailed gecko or the Mount Marsh leaf-tailed gecko is a species of gecko, a lizard in the family Carphodactylidae. The species is native to New South Wales.

== Etymology ==
The specific name, kateae, is in honor of Kate Couper, wife of the senior author of the original description of this species.

== Description ==
S. kateae may attain a snout-to-vent length (SVL) of 10.5 cm (4.1 in). The rostral is separated from the nostril, and the scales on the side of the snout grade evenly from small to large. There are no spinose tubercles on the dorsal surface of the digits. The tail has a slender tip without tubercles.

== Geographic range ==
S. kateae is endemic to the southern end of the Richmond Range in New South Wales. This area was severely affected by the 2019-2020 Australian megafires, with over 80% of the available habitat burned.

== Habitat ==
The preferred natural habitat of S. kateae is forest.

== Reproduction ==
S. kateae is oviparous.
