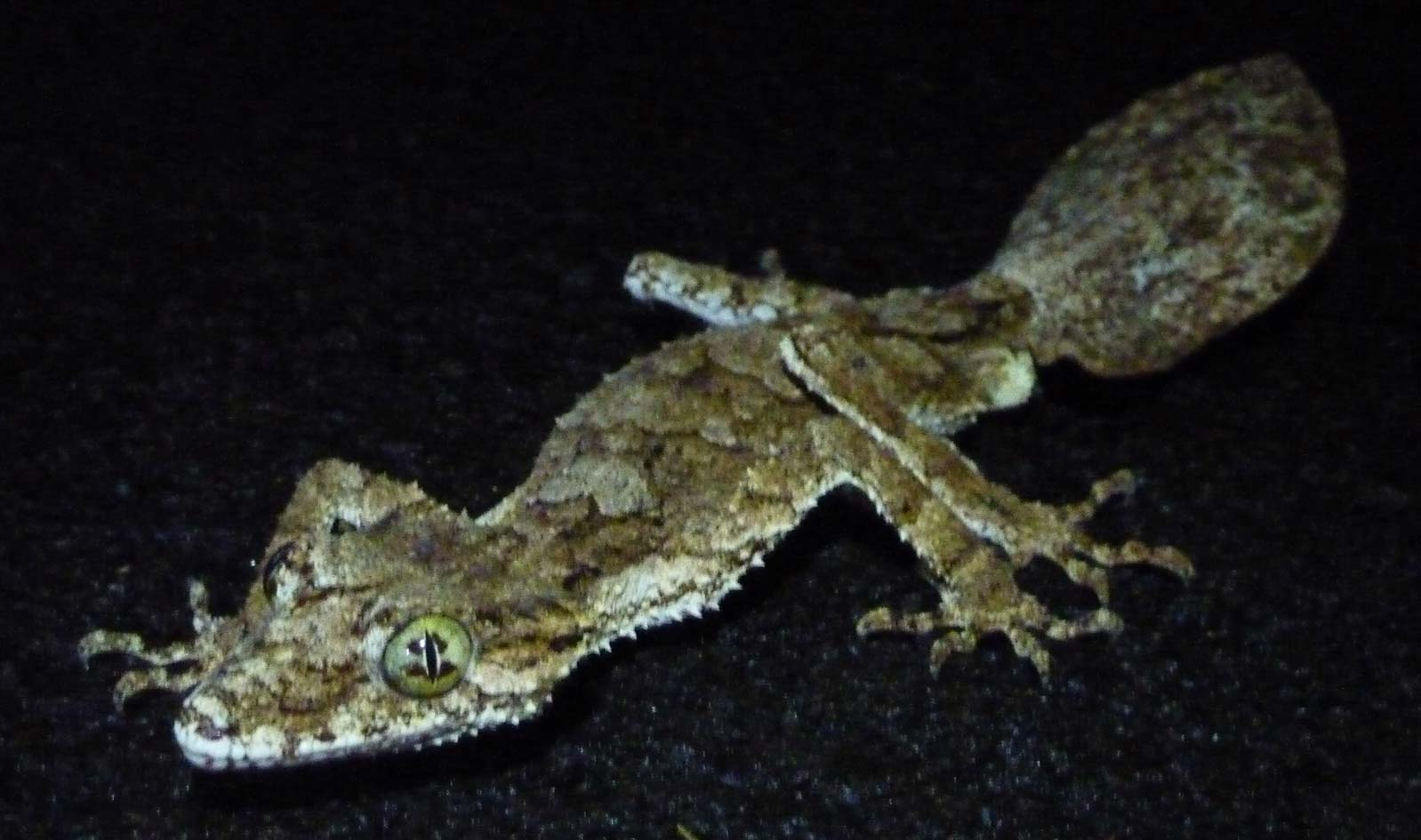

Conservation status
- Least Concern (IUCN 3.1)

Scientific classification
- Kingdom: Animalia
- Phylum: Chordata
- Class: Reptilia
- Order: Squamata
- Suborder: Gekkota
- Family: Carphodactylidae
- Genus: Saltuarius
- Species: S. cornutus

Binomial name
- Saltuarius cornutus (Ogilby 1892)

Synonyms
- Gymnodactylus cornutus Ogilby, 1892; Phyllurus cornutus (Ogilby, 1892)

= Northern leaf-tailed gecko =

Species of lizard

The northern leaf-tailed gecko (Saltuarius cornutus) is a species of the genus Saltuarius, the Australian leaf-tailed geckos.

== Description ==
Saltuarius cornutus is a large gecko with a triangular head, narrow neck, a body length to 14 cm and an 8 cm broad, leaf-like tail. Unlike most geckos, it has clawed toes and no adhesive discs, probably due to its arboreal lifestyle. Body is flattened and limbs are long and spindly; dorsal surface bears sharply pointed tubercles (its eponymous "horns"). Camouflage coloration strongly resembles lichen-mottled bark. Its scientific name translates to "Horned Keeper of the Forest".

== Habitat ==
Nocturnal tree dweller in warm temperate and tropical rainforests and wet sclerophyll forests, typically above 750m, in the Coastal and Great Dividing Ranges in NE Queensland and south to Taree in New South Wales.

== Behaviour ==
Active at night and in cool conditions when most reptiles rest. When threatened, the gecko arches its back, raises and wags its tail from side to side to draw attention away from the head- if attacked it will readily shed its tail and grow another; however the new tail will be broader and flatter with different coloration and a short tip. Also known to open mouth and charge aggressors while vocalizing.
Females lay 1–2 parchment-shelled eggs in a shallow nest covered with leaf litter and soil—up to 14 eggs from multiple females have been found in a single communal nest.

== Diet ==
The Northern leaf-tailed gecko eats large insects and other arthropods, including cockroaches, isopods, and spiders.
