= Christopher J. Schneider =

American sociologist (born 1979)

- Born: April 16, 1979 (age 47); Chicago, Illinois
- Citizenship: United States; Canada
- Education: Arizona State University; Northern Illinois University; Northeastern Illinois University
- Known for: Research and commentary on social media, crime, policing, popular culture, qualitative research methods
- Awards: Society for the Study of Symbolic Interaction Early-in-Career Award 2016 Canadian Criminal Justice Association Public Education Award (2017)
- Scientific career
- Fields: Sociology, Criminology
- Workplaces: Brandon University; Wilfrid Laurier University; University of British Columbia
- Thesis: Mass Media, Popular Culture, and Technology: Communication and Information Formats as Emergent Features of Social Control (2008)
- Doctoral advisor: David Altheide
- Website: www.chrisschneider.org twitter.com/sundaysociology

Christopher J. Schneider (born April 16, 1979) is an American sociologist and professor of sociology at Brandon University.

== Educational background ==
Schneider received his B.A. summa cum laude in 2002 from Northeastern Illinois University, with a major in sociology and a minor in criminal justice. Schneider was selected as the NEIU 2002 spring commencement speaker He received an M.A. in Sociology with a concentration in Criminology in 2004 from Northern Illinois University Schneider continued his graduate studies in Justice Studies at Arizona State University. In 2008, he graduated from ASU with a Doctoral Degree in Justice Studies.

== Appointments and positions ==
While studying toward his M.A. he was an instructor at NIU. From 2004 to 2008 Schneider was a part-time instructor and a teaching assistant at ASU. After receiving his PhD in Justice Studies in 2008, Schneider began his career as an assistant professor of sociology at the University of British Columbia, Okanagan campus where he taught for six years. In 2014, Schneider relocated to Wilfrid Laurier University where he was granted tenure and promoted to the position of Associate Professor of Law & Society. He relocated to Brandon University in 2015 where he is presently a professor of sociology

In November 2016, Schneider held the Public Visiting Scholar position in the Department of Criminology at WLU, a position offered to a scholar with "innovative research with public appeal". In 2019, Schneider held the Endowed Chair of Criminology and Criminal Justice position at St. Thomas University in Fredericton, New Brunswick, Canada. The Endowed Chair at STU is "offered to a scholar with a well-established record of research."

Schneider is a member of various editorial boards, e.g., including the editorial board of The Annual Review of Interdisciplinary Justice Research (IJR), Canada's only interdisciplinary journal of justice studies. Schneider is a member of the Brandon, MB John Howard Society Board of Directors

== Areas of research ==
Schneider's research is qualitative and focuses on how developments in media and technology contribute to changes in social interaction and social control. His book Policing and Social Media: Social Control in an Era of New Media illustrates the process by which new information technology—namely, social media—and related changes in communication formats have affected the public face of policing and police work in Canada. Policing and Social Media has been well received by an array of critics that include academics, police practitioners, journalists, and activists. Policing and Social Media reached No. 1 on Amazon's list of Hot New Releases in Canadian politics.

According to a review in the academic journal Symbolic Interaction, "Policing and Social Media is essential reading for scholars of media and crime." A review in the Police Journal: Theory, Practice and Principles said "This book is timely and of major importance given the increasingly central role social media now occupies in global policing, governance and accountability discourses. Alexandre Turgeon writes in the American Review of Canadian Studies: "In light of the many high-profile and recent police shootings in the United States, and the way that they were framed on YouTube and other social media sites, this book is a significant contribution on the field of policing and information".

The book has also been profiled extensively in news media. A review in Canadian news magazine Maclean's called Policing and Social Media "surprisingly populist". Community activist and freelance writer Tom Sandborn (in a review he wrote published in the Vancouver Sun), called the book "important" continuing "Schneider has done a fine job with this study, and anyone in Canada who cares about policing, privacy, civil liberties and personal freedom should read it". Sandborn, however also lamented that Schneider's "prose style is unfortunately a bit fusty and mannered, as is so often true of those who write from a faculty office." Likewise, Maclean's described the book as "dense with academic terminology". Tom Sandborn suggests that Schneider misses the mark because "he unfortunately pays more attention to how Canadian police forces use various net platforms to communicate with the public than to how those same cyber entities can be tapped by government spies to illicitly harvest information about Canadians".

While some reviews were positive, others noted some weaknesses with Schneider's approach. Christopher D. O'Conner noted a "substantial critique of the book is that Schneider's analysis is limited to texts. At times, the author makes claims regarding police intent without conducting interviews with officers about their own social media use. While text analysis is a completely valid methodological approach, interviewing officers would have provided a more well-rounded picture of the impact social media is having on policing." Likewise, Sarah Lageson sounds a note of caution about the book: "Because Schneider relies heavily on qualitative media analysis, readers might sense they are receiving a second-order interpretation of what happened. We don't get direct ethnographic insight into the internal processes of police departments as they grapple with using social media in their own PR and investigatory work."

Schneider's work has focused on the impact of social media on crime related matters including vigilante justice and crowd sourced-policing efforts online. Much of this research has examined the role of social media in relation to the 2011 Vancouver Stanley Cup riot Some of this research is cited in Policing Canada in the 21st Century: New Policing for New Challenges a 2014 Council of Canadian Academies report that addresses the external and internal challenges facing Canada's police. Other related research has explored the impact of social media on policing and police work in Canada.

Schneider's research has also focused on popular culture and social control. Some of this work has examined the relationships between media and popular culture including the framing and censorship of rap music and the use of mobile phone ringtones as individual ways to manage identity. Other work in the area of popular culture has explored celebrity news coverage and TMZ and beards

Schneider's co-authored book Defining Sexual Misconduct: Power, Media, and #MeToo informed a key change to Canadian military policy which removed "sexual misconduct" from military policy replacing it with the term "sexual assault." Defining Sexual Misconduct was short-listed in The Hill Times Best Books of 2022 and received an Honorable Mention for the 2023 Charles Horton Cooley Book Award, given annually for a book that represents an important contribution to symbolic interactionism, from the Society for the Study of Symbolic Interaction. Defining Sexual Misconduct won the 2024 Midwest Sociological Society's Distinguished Book Award for its "exemplary, original, and substantive contribution to sociological understanding." Schneider's research on police body-worn cameras was used for a 2026 episode of Last Week Tonight with John Oliver.

== Publications ==
=== Books ===
- Schneider, C.J. & Laming, E. (2026). Police Body-Worn Cameras: Media and the New Discourse of Police Reform. New York, Routledge.
- Schneider, C.J. (2024). Policing and Social Media: Social Control in an Era of Digital Media, 2nd Edition. Lanham, MD: Lexington Books | Rowman & Littlefield.
- Schneider, C.J. (2024). Doing Public Scholarship: A Practical Guide to Media Engagement. New York, Routledge.
- Hannem, S., & Schneider, C.J. (2022). Defining Sexual Misconduct: Power, Media, #MeToo. Regina, Canada: University of Regina Press.
- Hannem, S, Sanders, C.B., Schneider, C.J., Doyle, A., & Christensen, T. (eds) (2019). Security and Risk Technologies in Criminal Justice: Critical Perspectives. Toronto, ON: Canadian Scholars.
- Schneider, C.J. (2016). Policing and Social Media: Social Control in an Era of New Media. Lanham, MD: Lexington Books | Rowman & Littlefield.
- Hanemaayer, A., & Schneider, C.J. (eds) (2014). The Public Sociology Debate: Ethics and Engagement. Vancouver, BC: University of British Columbia Press.
- Altheide, D., & Schneider, C.J. (2013). Qualitative Media Analysis Second Edition. Newbury Park, CA: Sage.
- Aguiar, L., & Schneider, C.J. (eds) (2012). Researching Amongst Elites: Challenges and Opportunities in Studying Up. London: Ashgate.

=== Keynote Address ===
- Schneider, C.J. (2019). 2017 Couch-Stone Symposium Keynote Address: The Interaction Order in the Twenty-first Century and the Case of Police Legitimacy. Studies in Symbolic Interaction: 50th Anniversary Issue, Vol 50: 97–115.

== Awards ==
- 2026 Brandon University Brandon University Alumni Association Award for Teaching Excellence
- 2024 Brandon University Board of Governors Award for Excellence in Community Service, in recognition of "a University employee who through cumulative volunteer activities best contributes to the community service function of the University."
- 2024 Midwest Sociological Society Distinguished Book Award, in recognition of a book that makes "an exemplary, original, and substantive contribution to sociological understanding."
- 2022 Brandon University Senate Award for Excellence in Research, in recognition of "those individuals who excel in scholarship and research."
- 2021 Harper College Distinguished Alumni Award, in recognition of "alumni who have distinguished themselves in their careers and in their service to community."
- 2020 Emerald Literati Outstanding Author Contribution Award, in recognition of "authors who have contributed something new or of significant value to the body of knowledge, either in terms of approach or subject matter."
- 2017 Canadian Criminal Justice Association, Public Education Award, "Recognizes persons who significantly advance public understandings in Canada for the need for, and elements of, a humane, effective criminal justice system."
- 2016 Society for the Study of Symbolic Interaction, Early-In-Career-Award, "Honors those scholars who have made significant contributions within the first ten years since the completion of their PhDs."
- 2013 The Confederation of University Faculty Associations of British Columbia, Distinguished Academics Early-In-Career Award, for "outstanding contributions made by scholars at relatively early stages."
- 2011 University of British Columbia, Award for Teaching Excellence and Innovation
- 2010 University of British Columbia, Award for Public Education Through Media for "actively and creatively sharing research expertise via news media."
- 2002 American Society of Criminology, Division of Critical Criminology Graduate Student Paper of the Year Award, "recognizes and honors outstanding theoreotical or empirical critical criminological scholarship by a graduate student."
