= South Cumberland Islands National Park =

National park in Australia

- IUCN category II (national park)
- Location within Queensland
- Location: Queensland
- Nearest city: Mackay, Queensland
- Coordinates: 20°44′28″S 149°28′25″E
- Area: 21.8 km^{2} (8.4 sq mi)
- Governing body: Queensland Parks and Wildlife Service
- Website: Official website

South Cumberland Islands is a national park in Queensland, Australia, 831 km northwest of Brisbane. It is famous for the marine stingers which can be found in the waters of the park between October and May.

== Islands ==
Islands that are protected within the park include (portion of) Keswick Island, St Bees Island, Cockermouth Island, and Scawfell Island (formerly named L Island), which is the largest in the group.

=== Scawfell Island ===
Scawfell Island (located at 20°52'S., 149°37'E., 60 kilometres (37 mi) off the cost of Queensland, north-east of Mackay) is officially regarded as the beginning of the Whitsunday group. It was originally part of the Cumberland Isles Group identified by Captain James Cook in 1770, but was not named. The island is one of the Cumberland Isles, later known as Whitsundays, and is now part of the South Cumberland Islands. It was named "L Island" by Matthew Flinders in September 1802, during his circumnavigation of Australia in Investigator. It was later renamed as Scawfell Island in 1879, by Staff Commander E. P. Bedwell of the Royal Navy, who surveyed and named many islands of the Whitsundays in 1879 in SS Llewellyn. The name of the island originates from England's second highest peak, Scafell, in Cumbria, which was then spelt "Scawfell".

The terrain of the island rises to a peak 397 metres (1,302 ft) high, south-east of Duddon Point, the northern extremity of the island. The island lies and is a large horseshoe shape, with granite cliffs along the coast. It is the largest national park island in the South Cumberland group, and is uninhabited. Large areas of tropical rainforest cover steep mountain slopes. There is a coral fringing reef.

Refuge Bay on Scawfell Island provides good anchorage and fishing is permitted here. Bush camping is permitted on Scawfell Island but visitors must be self-sufficient, and a permit is required from Queensland National Parks. Camping is at sheltered sites in Refuge Bay.

In February 2023, a report by Dr Conrad Hoskin reported the finding of the Scawfell Island leaf-tailed gecko (Phyllurus fimbriatus), growing to 15 cm.

=== St Bees Island ===
St Bees Island is the 2nd largest island in the group 10.32 km^{2} (3.98 sq mi),

== See also ==
- List of islands of Australia
- Protected areas of Queensland
