= Jeanette Covacevich =

Australian herpetologist and museum curator

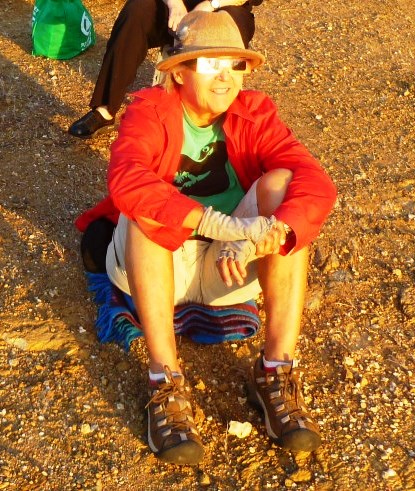
- Born: 26 March 1945; Innisfail, Queensland, Australia
- Died: 17 December 2015 (aged 70); Cairns, Queensland, Australia
- Citizenship: Australian
- Education: (tertiary education): Griffith University
- Scientific career
- Fields: Scientist

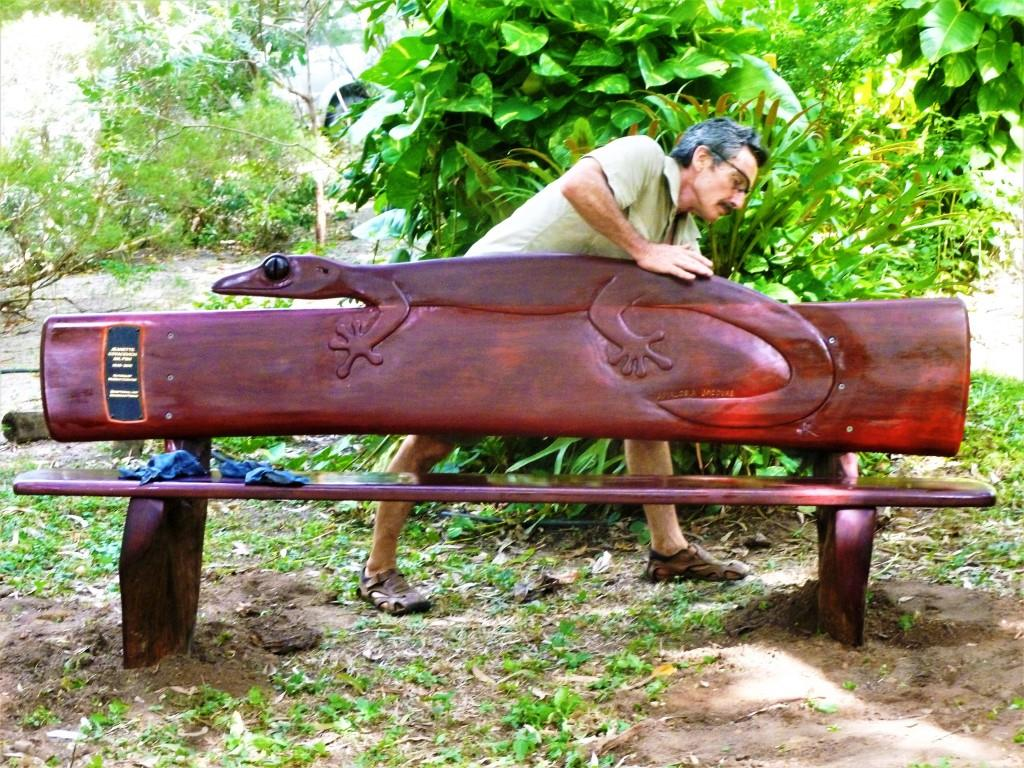
Memorial bench for Jeanette Covacevich in Cooktown Botanic Gardens.

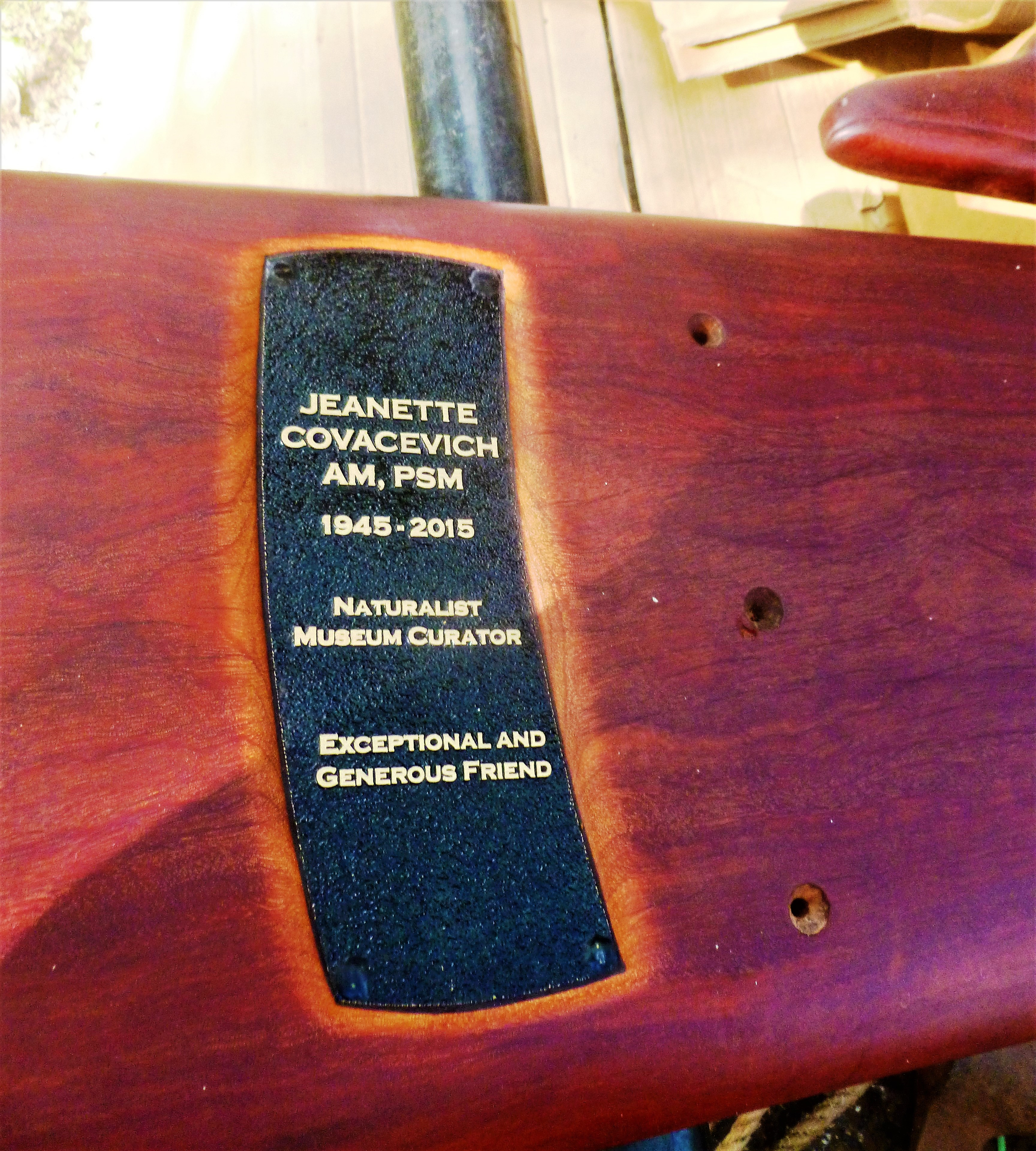
Plaque on memorial bench for Jeanette Covacevich

Jeanette Adelaide Covacevich AM (1945–2015) was a herpetologist in Queensland, Australia. As a senior curator of vertebrates at the Queensland Museum, she discovered and studied many reptiles and frogs in Queensland. Covacevich is most famous for rediscovering and describing the Inland Taipan snake (Oxyuranus microlepidotus), the world's most venomous snake. In addition, she described over thirty new species and genera including the Cape York striped blind snake (Ramphotyphlops chamodracaena), the Nangur spiny skink (Nangura spinosa), and the Bulburin leaf-tailed gecko (Phyllurus caudiannulatus).

On 12 June 1995 she was awarded the Member of the Order of Australia for her contribution to science, in particular for herpetology and conservation.

Covacevich is commemorated in the scientific name of a species of earthworm, Terriswalkerius covacevichae; the Australian spiders, Zophorame covacevichae and Kababina covacevichae; the Australian frog, Pseudophryne covacevichae; and the Australian gecko, Amalosia jacovae (J. A. Cov. + Latin suffix -ae).
