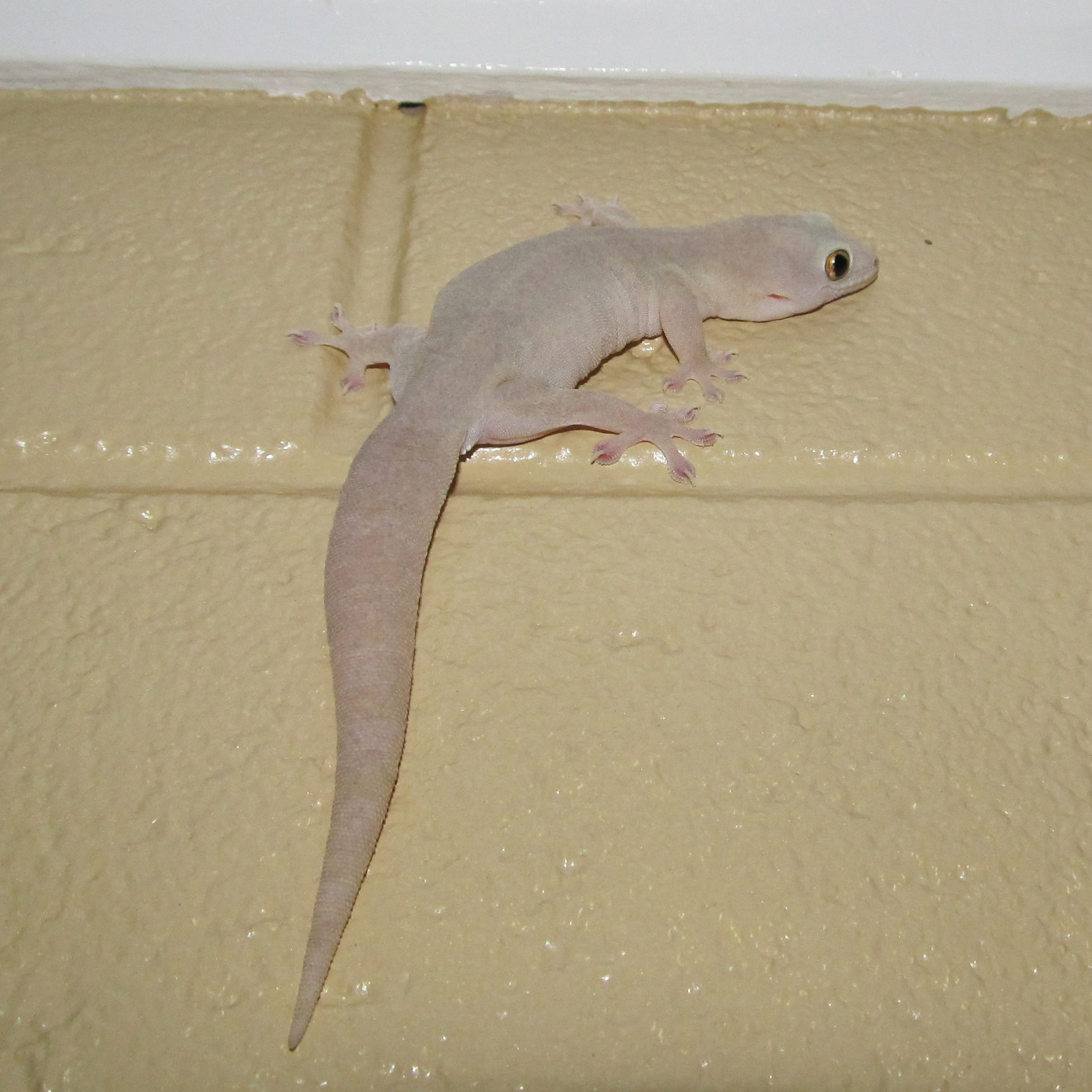

Conservation status
- Least Concern (IUCN 3.1)

Scientific classification
- Kingdom: Animalia
- Phylum: Chordata
- Class: Reptilia
- Order: Squamata
- Suborder: Gekkota
- Family: Gekkonidae
- Genus: Gehyra
- Species: G. australis

Binomial name
- Gehyra australis (Gray, 1845)
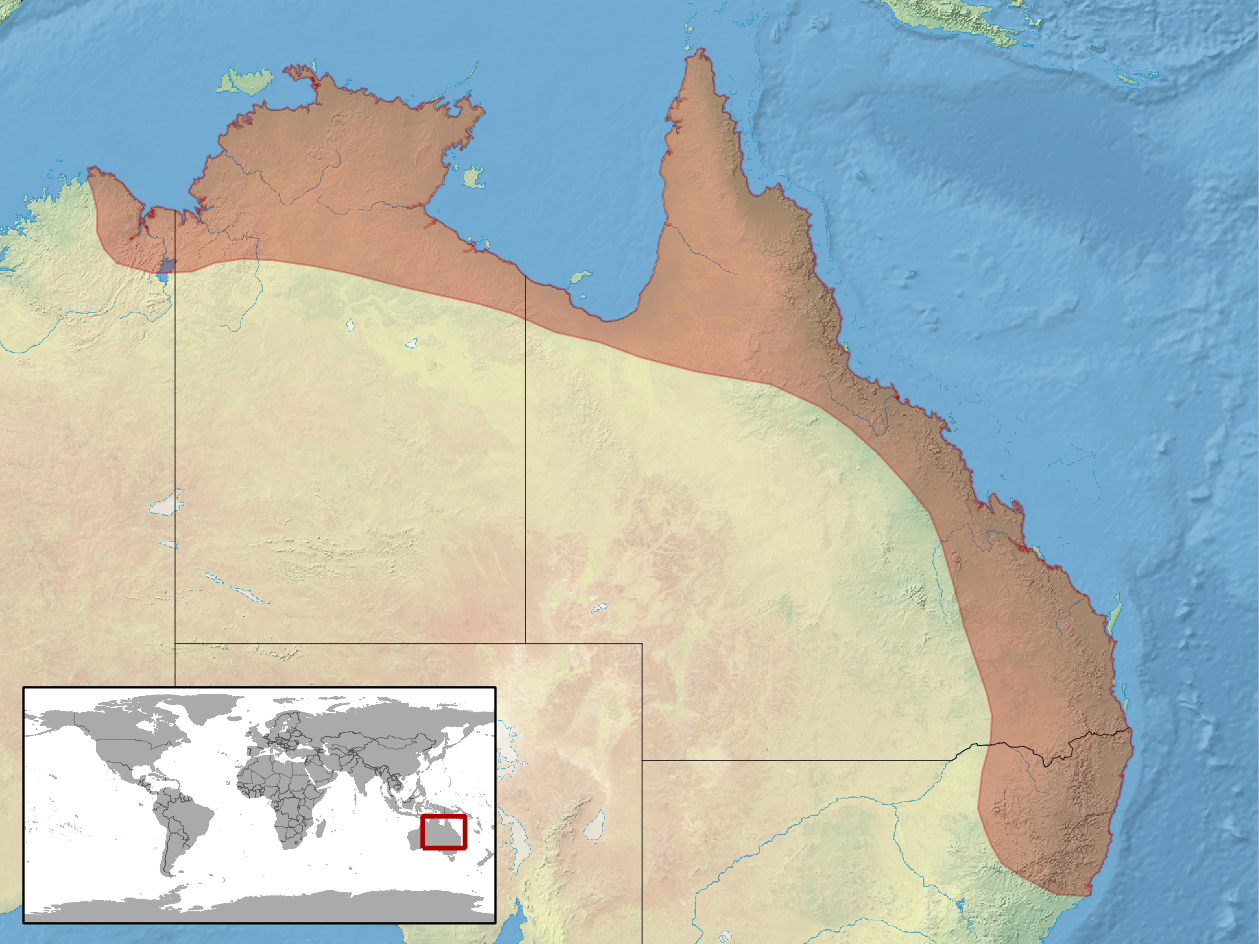

Synonyms
- Hemidactylus australis (Gray, 1845); Phyria punctulata Gray, 1842; Platydactylus australis (Gray, 1845)

= Gehyra australis =

Species of lizard

Gehyra australis, the Australian house gecko, northern dtella or top-end dtella, is a species of gecko native to northern and eastern Australia. It is also widespread in Indonesia, alongside common house geckos and four-clawed geckos.

Gehyra australis is primarily an arboreal gecko inhabiting woodlands and coastal and riverine forests. It can also occur near human dwellings and gardens. It is oviparous.

== Systematics ==
In 2020, as a result of molecular genetic analysis, three new species were proposed for lineages of the Gehyra australis species complex: G. arnhemica (east Arnhem Land), G. gemina (northern deserts), and G. lauta (gulf, NT–Qld border). Names for the new species were registered in Zoobank. Under this definition, the range of G. australis sensu stricto is limited to the western Top End region of the Northern Territory, from Darwin surrounds to Port Essington, and Gregory National Park To Eva Valley at the edge of the Arnhem Plateau.

Members of the australis species complex are generally arboreal, and tend to be smaller than the rock-dwelling (saxicolous) koira group, though G. lauta is larger-bodied. G. chimera is adapted to an arboreal lifestyle: it had previously been classified in G. australis, but genetically clusters with G. koira. Adult males of G. australis sensu stricto have 10–14 pre-cloacal pores, whereas G. arnhemica and G. lauta have 21-26 and 22–32 respectively. The various new species also differ in details of their scale patterns, particularly on the chin.

Along with the G. australis and G. koira species complexes, the related species Gehyra borroloola, Gehyra robusta, and Gehyra pamela form a clade that is referred to as the "Gehyra australis group".

=== Nomenclature ===
Gray's original 1845 description of G. australis was based on two specimens in the Natural History Museum of the UK. In 1983, Cogger, Cameron, and Cogger designated the Port Essington (NT) specimen as a lectotype and the Swan River (WA) specimen as a paralectotype. The location and pore count of the lectotype are consistent with the "australis 2" clade, which as a result is identified with the name Gehyra australis Gray, 1845.

== See also ==
- Dubious dtella, native Australian house gecko, or dubious four-clawed gecko (Gehyra dubia)
