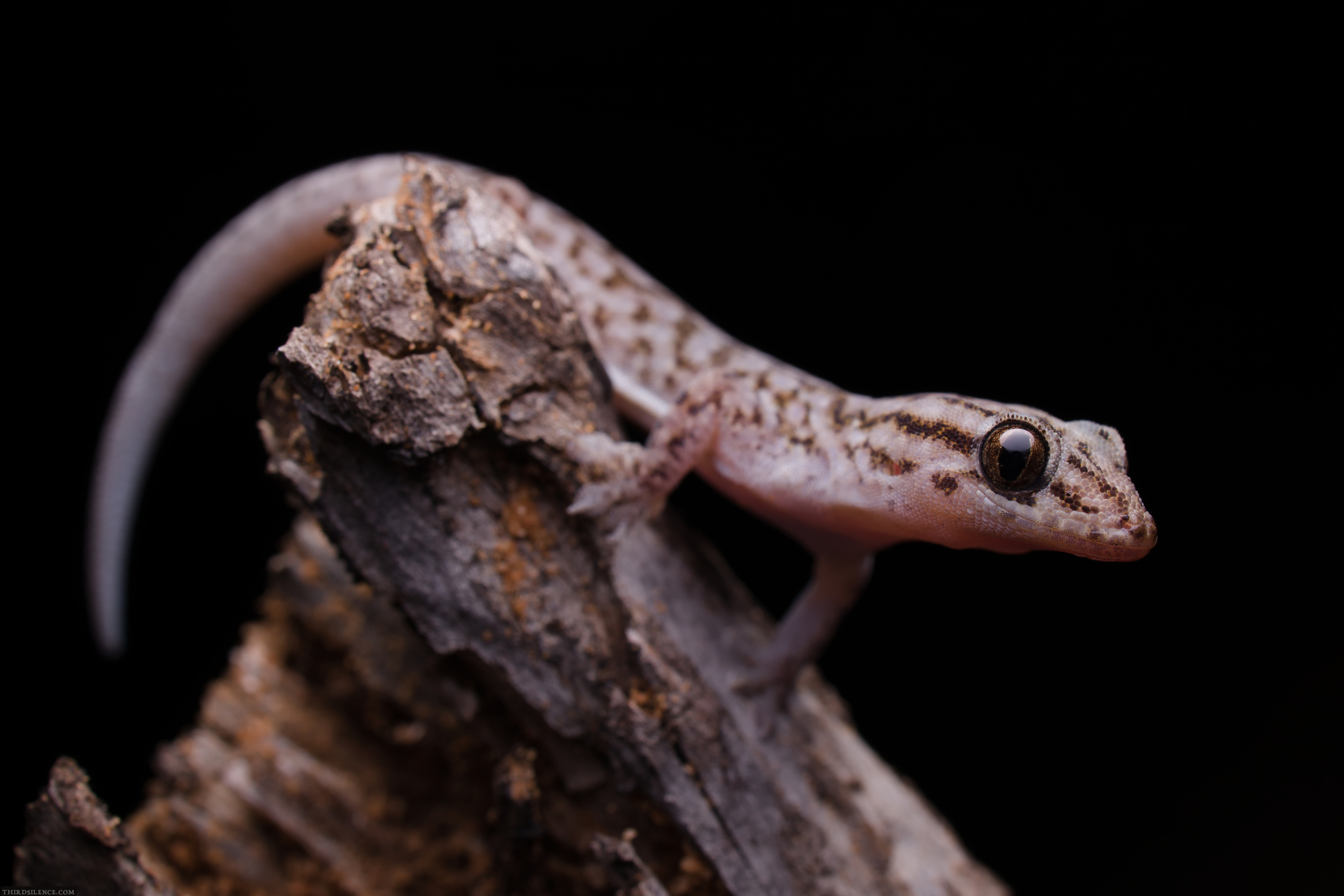

Scientific classification
- Kingdom: Animalia
- Phylum: Chordata
- Class: Reptilia
- Order: Squamata
- Suborder: Gekkota
- Family: Gekkonidae
- Genus: Gehyra
- Species: G. versicolor

Binomial name
- Gehyra versicolor Hutchinson, Sistrom, Donnellan, & Hutchinson, 2014

= Gehyra versicolor =

Species of lizard

Gehyra versicolor, commonly known as the eastern tree dtella. is a native Australian gecko occurring in temperate forests of eastern Australia.

== Taxonomy ==
It was formerly considered as conspecific with Gehyra variegata until classified as a separate species in 2014.

== Description ==
G. versicolor is a medium grey to brown gecko with complex dark and white markings. It can have faint to prominent white spots or short lines adjoining on the posterior margins of dark markings. The G. Versicolor has a flattened body and pads at the end of each toe. They contain 8-11 pairs of supralabial scales. The max body length is 57mm. The adult snout length is between 37-54mm. The length of full-grown tail is between 40-58mm. The G. versicolor and G. variegate are extremely difficult to extinguish based on external morphology as they share the characteristics. The species are distinguished due to their difference in karyotype and distribution.

== Evolutionary History ==
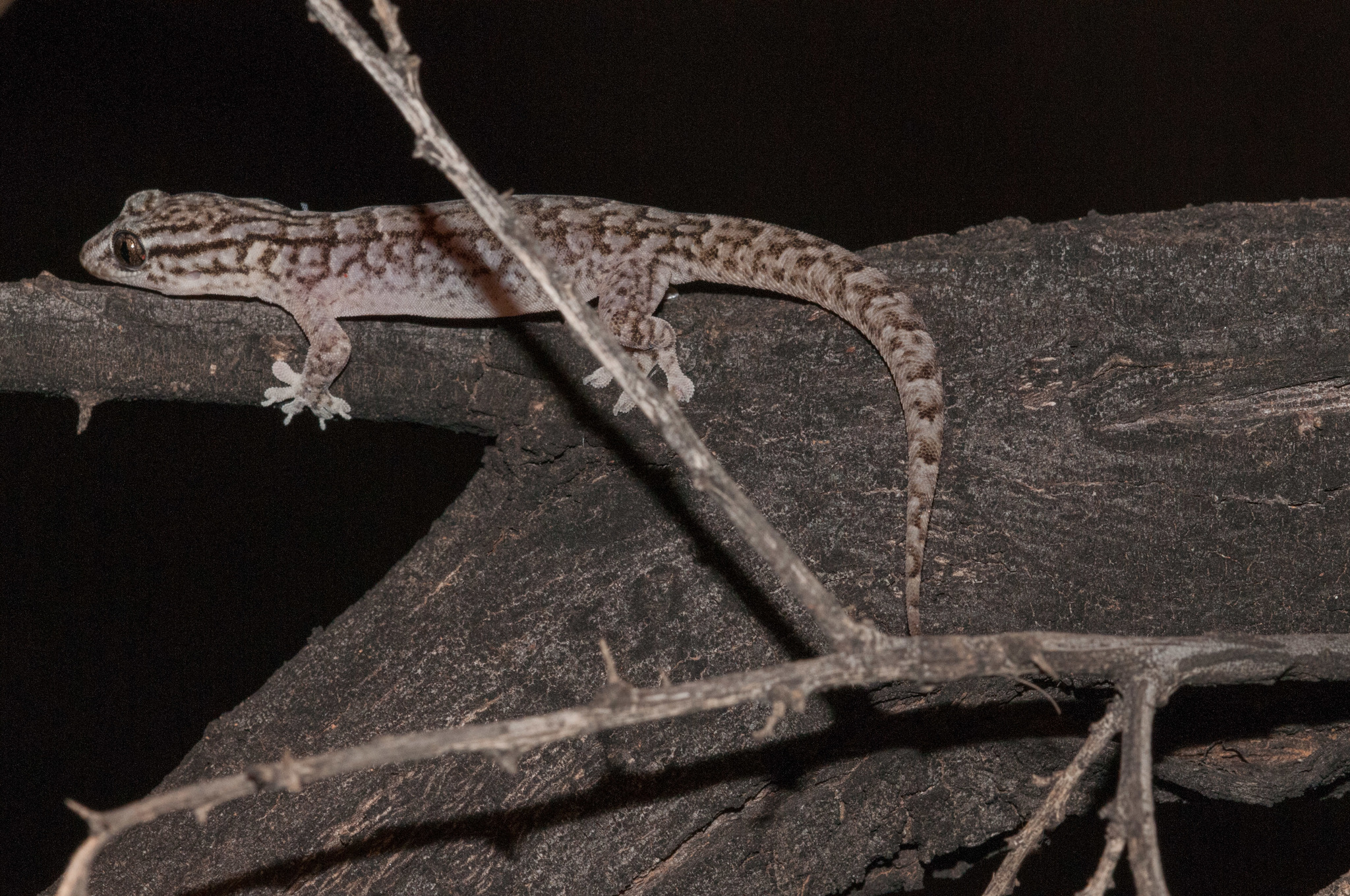

Historically, the genus Gehyra has been difficult to delimit due to their continent-wide distribution, similar morphological characteristics and high genetic diversity among the group. In the 1970s and the 1980s, chromosomal studies found that there was substantial heterogeneity and independent patterns of karyotypic diversity within some of the species of Gehyra . In 1982, the three species found were the G. variegate, G. monitum, and G. nana. In 2014, molecular genetic studies found that there were five separate species within the Gehyra genus. G. monitum was split into two new species known as G. moritzi and G. pulingka . The G. variegate Eastern Australian populations are now known as the G. versicolor .

The most recent ancestor of the genus Gehyr migrated from Asia to Australia during the late-Eocene to mid- Miocene (13-33 million years ago). It was highly adapted to tropical environments and the division of the genus occurred when they migrated to the arid Kimberly region.

== Distribution ==
G. versicolor is widespread over the Eastern part of Australia. Its range stretches from northern Victoria through the Great Dividing Range of New South Wales and up to North Queensland. It stretches west into most of South Australia and into central Northern Territory. It is not found in Western Australia or Tasmania.

== Habitat ==
G. versicolor is reliant on native, mature, woody vegetation for habitat. These semi-arid macrohabitats are widespread usually fall under the categories of dry woodland, desert or savannah woodland. Vegetation is often composed of Red Gum, Pine- Buloke, Mallee and Black Box Woodland.

The microhabitat of G. versicolor is characterised of thick peeling bark, fallen logs, fallen timber, leaf litter and rocks. The species is both arboreal and saxicoline, relying on both the group and mid-canopy habitats.

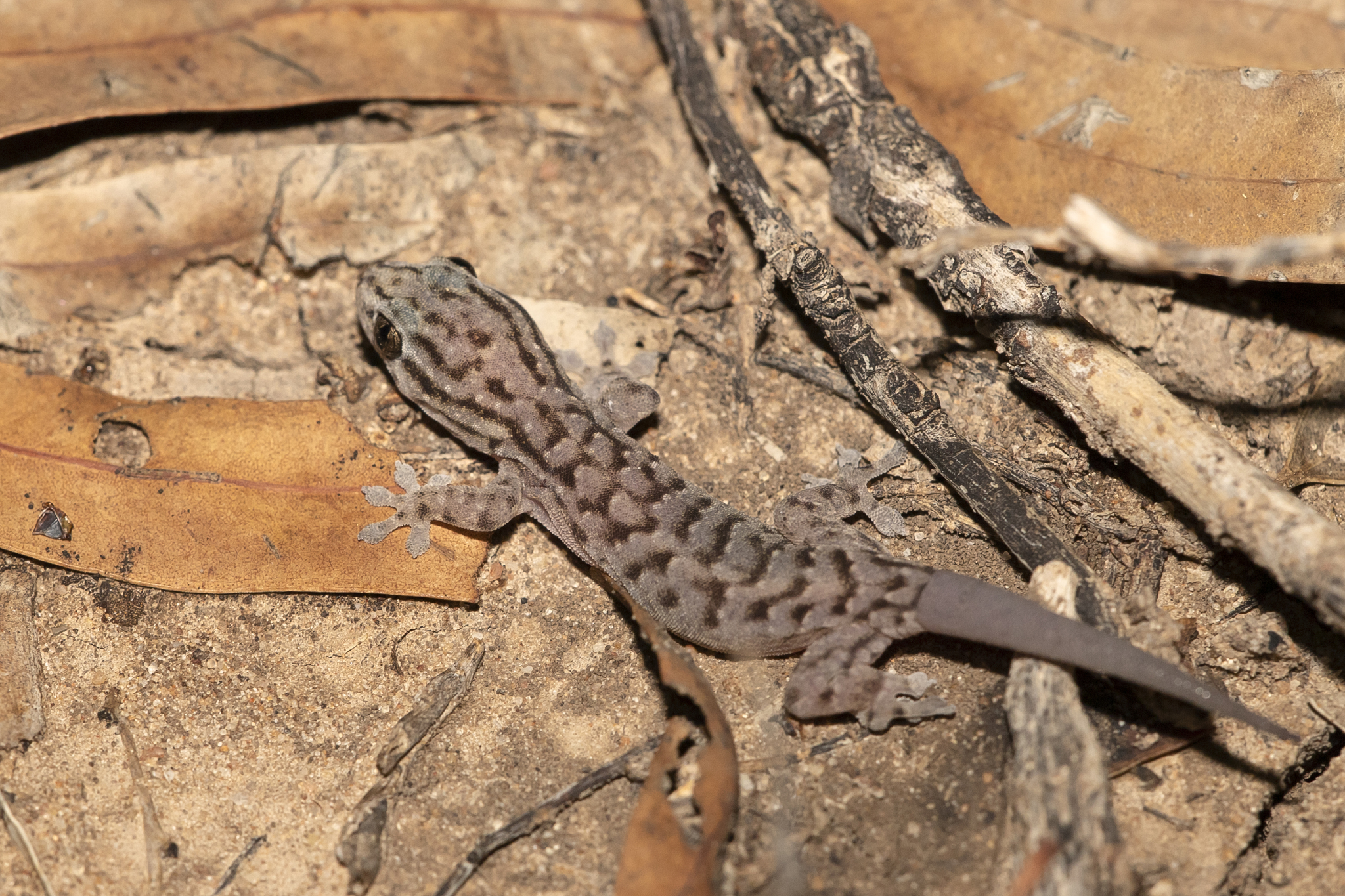
Gehyra versicolor in leaf-litter

== Ecology ==
=== Reproduction ===
Male and female G. versicolor reach sexual maturity at 2 years of age but do not begin breeding until 3 years old. Females lay a single egg twice per year. The first egg is laid in late spring and the second egg is laid in mid-summer. Eggs are dispersed away from parent habitat and are usually laid under protective logs, bark or rock formations. Eggs hatch approximately 60–80 days after they are laid.

=== Behaviour ===
G. versicolor is primarily nocturnal but is known to be active during the day to thermoregulate. Like all reptilian species, G. Versicolor is cold-blooded and must thermoregulate through behavioural actions, such as sunning themselves. Breeding and growth are limited to the warmer months within a year and the species undergo a state of torpor during the colder winter months.

Males are territorial and only one can occur per tree. Males often share a habitat with one or two females. Like most geckos, they are tolerating of young and will share their microhabitat with them for long periods of time.

G. versicolor have limited dispersal movements. The largest movements occur when the female deposit their eggs within a different microhabitat. Young also disperse when finding vacant and suitable microhabitats.

G. versicolor, like all species of the genus Gehyra, can detach their tail as defensive mechanism and regrow it back. When a G. versicolor is stressed, they drop their tail in an attempt to distract and escape from predators.

=== Diet ===
G. versicolor is an omnivore that preys on a variety of arthropods including beetles, spiders and crickets ^{[4]}. They also rely on sap from gum bleeds due to its high nutrient intake ^{[5]}. G. Versicolor will continuously lick sap and are more commonly found on vegetation with significant gum bleeds such as the A. Victoriae ^{[5]}.

=== Competition and predation ===
G. versicolor have limited competition with native species. The geckos, Oedura ocellata Boulenger and the Heteronotia binoei (Gray) compete for the same macrohabitat but have different microhabitat and food resources. Termites are a competing native species with the G. versicolor as they degrade microhabitats used by the gecko.

G. versicolor are known to be a common food resource for many native and invasive predators. They are predated by red foxes and feral cats (invasive), marsupial mice, kookaburras, ravens, butcher-birds and larger lizards and skinks (native).

=== Ecological role ===
G. versicolor play a vital role within their ecosystem. They are an abundant food resources for many predators, including a variety of birds, reptiles and mammals. They are also responsible for pollination and seed dispersal for many native vegetative species. Whilst looking for food, the gecko often rubs against plant stigmas and allows for cross-pollination between other species and populations.

== Threats and conservation status ==
G. versicolor is categorised at least concern on the ranking of conservation status. It has a stable and highly abundant population. However, the G. versicolor is especially vulnerable to habitat loss and fragmentation. They are an interior species that rely on continuous, mature, native habitat. They are not effective dispersers, so are unable to migrate if their habitat is targeted by land-clearing. It was found that G. versicolor completely avoid agricultural landscapes and edge habitat due to the high rates of predation.
