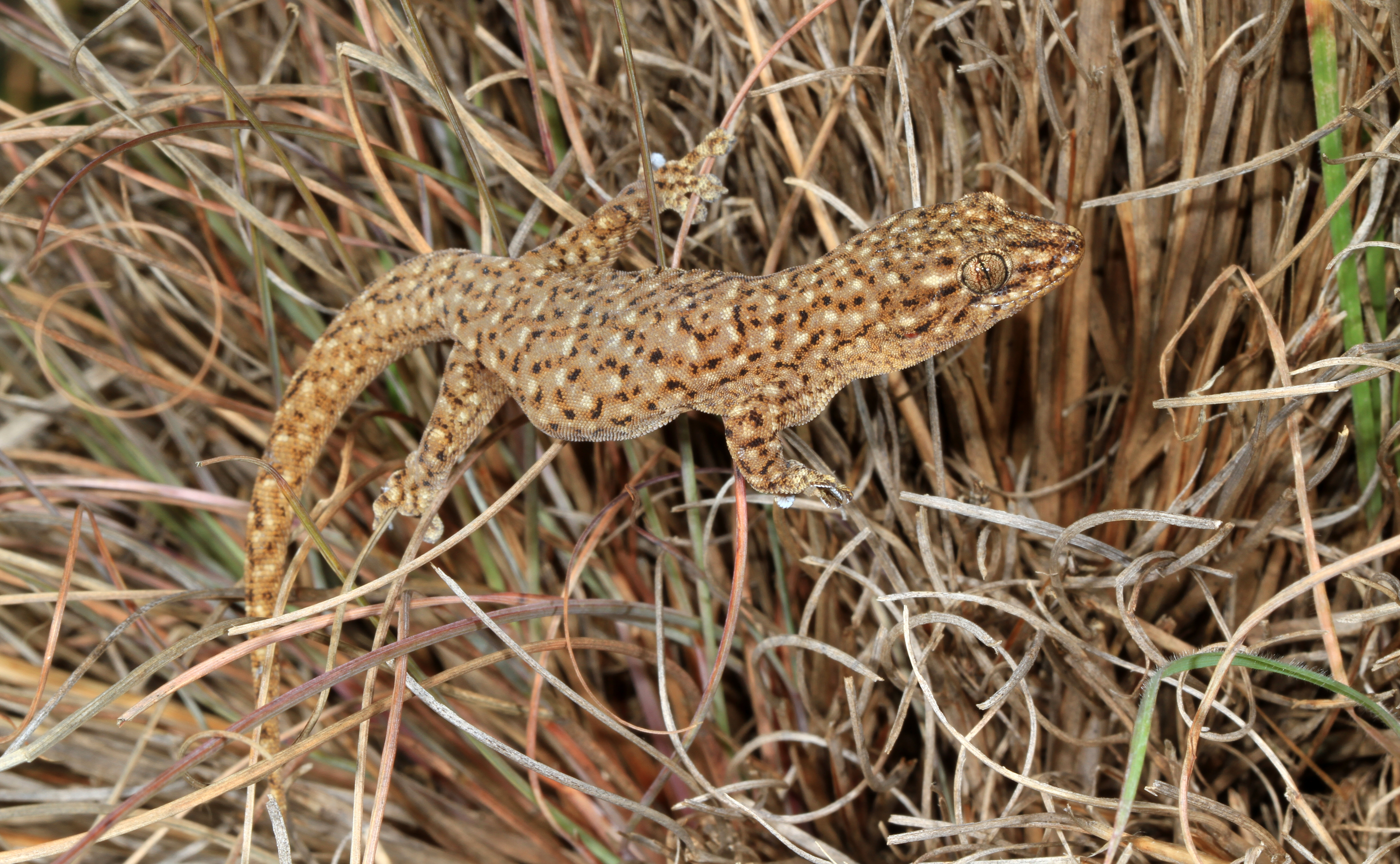

Scientific classification
- Kingdom: Animalia
- Phylum: Chordata
- Class: Reptilia
- Order: Squamata
- Suborder: Gekkota
- Family: Gekkonidae
- Genus: Gehyra
- Species: G. lazelli

Binomial name
- Gehyra lazelli (Wells & Wellington, 1985)

Synonyms
- Dactyloperus lazelli; Dactyloperus annetteae

= Gehyra lazelli =

Species of lizard

Gehyra lazelli more commonly known as the southern rock dtella or Lazell's dtella is a species of gecko in the genus Gehyra, native to Australia.

== Description ==
The species varies in color from a dull brown to a grey brown, speckled with white spots in a variegated appearance, somewhat resembling patches of lichen on exposed rock. Its variegated appearance also acts as a form of camouflage from predators such as birds, blending in with surfaces of exposed rock and leaf litter. The body is rather flat, accompanied by a slender tail and homogeneous scales across the species body. A key identifier of G. lazelli is that the species third and fourth toes are free from webbing while the rest of the fingers and toes are webbed together with pads on their surface for grip.

== Distribution ==
Endemic to Australia, the distribution of G. lazelli extends from central and Western New South Wales, to The Nullarbor plain in South Australia. Sightings close to the North West Victorian border lead to speculation the species distribution extends into the fringes of semi arid Victoria.

== Habitat and diet ==
The species is commonly found sunning itself on exposed rock or hiding in between crevices in rocky outcrops and stony hills. It can also be found underneath thick bark or fallen logs and forages for food at night in these rocky areas. The species relies on these outcrops as a source of energy, food and protection from predators such as birds. A majority of lizards feed on animal protein and are generalist in nature, meaning they are not fussy eaters. G. lazelli is no exception, feeding on small arthropods up to as big as it can fit inside its mouth.

== Ecology ==
The genus Gehyra, to which G. lazelli belongs, consists of 44 different Australian species occurring across much of arid, semi-arid and tropical Northern Australia. The most common and widespread of the genus is Gehyra variegata (tree dtella), which occurs across most of Australia. Unfortunately because of extensive land clearing of Australia's interior woodlands, the species' habitat is becoming more fragmented. The species reproduces oviparously, meaning that it lays eggs that hatch live young. Like most geckos, they have a clutch size of two and have been observed laying eggs in communal nests with the same or similar species of gecko. In cooler areas, some species of lizard use viviparity to bear young as the cooler temperatures limit the success of oviparity.

== Conservation status ==
Currently the species is listed under least concern on the IUCN global list of threatened species and is protected in Australia under the Environment Protection and Biodiversity Conservation Act (1999).
