= Gehyra =

- Gehyra marginata

Scientific classification
- Kingdom: Animalia
- Phylum: Chordata
- Class: Reptilia
- Order: Squamata
- Suborder: Gekkota
- Family: Gekkonidae
- Subfamily: Gekkoninae
- Genus: Gehyra; Gray, 1834

Species
- 72 recognized species, see text.

Genus of lizards

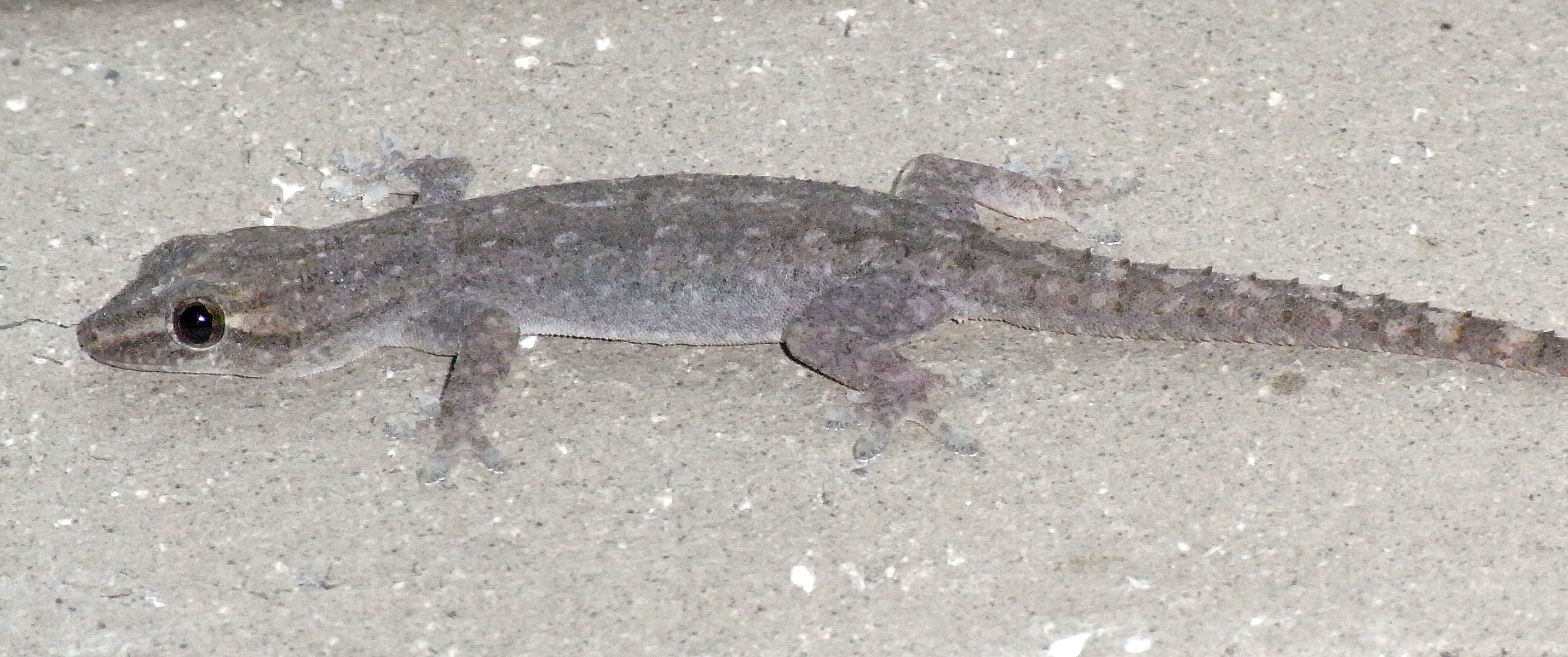
Gehyra dubia, dubious dtella

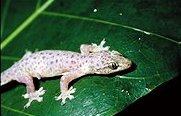
Gehyra mutilata, stump-toed gecko

Gehyra is a genus of geckos, lizards in the family Gekkonidae. Species within the genus are known as web-toed geckos or dtellas, and most bear close resemblance to geckos from the genus Hemidactylus.

== Geographic range ==
Gehyra species have a wide geographic range, covering most of the Oceania and Melanesian Islands as far north as the Ryukyu Islands and Thailand.

== Description ==
Dtellas are moderate-sized geckos that resemble house geckos. Gehyra species have toepads and powerful claws. Like some other geckos, they have a tendency to drop strips of skin if handled carelessly. Similar to house geckos, dtellas are able to communicate with clicks or chirps, although their chirp is often quieter than that of house geckos.

== Species ==
The following species are recognized as being valid.

- Gehyra angusticaudata (E.H. Taylor, 1963) – narrow-tailed four-clawed gecko
- Gehyra arnhemica Oliver, Prasetya, Tedeschi, Fenker, Ellis, Doughty & Moritz, 2020 – East Arnhem land gehyra
- Gehyra australis (Gray, 1845) – top-end dtella
- Gehyra baliola (A.H.A. Duméril, 1851) – short-tailed dtella
- Gehyra barea Kopstein, 1926 – Banda Island dtella
- Gehyra borroloola King, 1984 – Borroloola dtella
- Gehyra brevipalmata (W. Peters, 1874) – Palau Island dtella
- Gehyra calcitectus Oliver, Prasetya, Tedeschi, Fenker, Ellis, Doughty & Moritz, 2020 – relictual karst gehyra
- Gehyra capensis Kealley, Doughty, Pepper, Keogh, Hillyer & Huey, 2018 – North West Cape gehyra
- Gehyra catenata Low, 1979 – chain-backed dtella
- Gehyra chimera Oliver, Prasetya, Tedeschi, Fenker, Ellis, Doughty & Moritz, 2020 – western Kimberley tree gehyra
- Gehyra crypta Kealley, Doughty, Pepper, Keogh, Hillyer & Huey, 2018 – western cryptic gehyra
- Gehyra dubia (Macleay, 1877) – dubious dtella
- Gehyra einasleighensis Bourke, Pratt, Vanderduys & Moritz, 2017 – Einasleigh rock dtella
- Gehyra electrum Zozaya, Fenker & MacDonald, 2019 – amber rock dtella
- Gehyra fehlmanni (E.H. Taylor, 1962) – Fehlmann's dtella
- Gehyra fenestrula Doughty, Bauer, Pepper & Keogh, 2018 – Hamersley Range spotted gehyra
- Gehyra finipunctata Doughty, Bauer, Pepper, Keogh & Ellis, 2018 – small-spotted midwest rock gehyra
- Gehyra gemina Oliver, Prasetya, Tedeschi, Fenker, Ellis, Doughty & Moritz, 2020 – plain tree gehyra
- Gehyra georgpotthasti Flecks et al., 2012
- Gehyra girloorloo Oliver, Bourke, Pratt, Doughty & Moritz, 2016 – Kimberley karst gecko
- Gehyra granulum Doughty, Palmer, Bourke, Tedeschi, Oliver & Moritz, 2018 – Kimberley granular-toed gecko
- Gehyra incognita Kealley, Doughty, Pepper, Keogh, Hillyer & Huey, 2018 – northern Pilbara cryptic gehyra
- Gehyra insulensis Girard, 1858 – Pacific stump-toed gecko
- Gehyra interstitialis Oudemans, 1894 – Oudemans's dtella
- Gehyra ipsa Horner, 2005 – Bungle Bungle Ranges gehyra
- Gehyra kimberleyi Börner & Schüttler, 1982 – Kimberley dtella
- Gehyra koira Horner, 2005 – banded rock dtella
- Gehyra lacerata (E.H. Taylor, 1962) – lacerated dtella
- Gehyra lapistola Oliver, Prasetya, Tedeschi, Fenker, Ellis, Doughty & Moritz, 2020 – Litchfield rock gehyra
- Gehyra lauta Oliver, Prasetya, Tedeschi, Fenker, Ellis, Doughty & Moritz, 2020 – Gulf tree gehyra
- Gehyra lazelli (Wells & Wellington, 1985)
- Gehyra leopoldi Brongersma, 1930 – Leopold dtella
- Gehyra macra Doughty, Bauer, Pepper & Keogh, 2018 – large Pilbara rock gehyra
- Gehyra marginata Boulenger, 1887 – Halmahera giant gecko, Ternate dtella
- Gehyra media Doughty, Bauer, Pepper & Keogh, 2018 – medium Pilbara spotted rock gehyra
- Gehyra membranacruralis King & Horner, 1989 – Port Moresby dtella
- Gehyra micra Doughty, Bauer, Pepper & Keogh, 2018 – small Pilbara spotted rock gehyra
- Gehyra minuta King, 1982 – dwarf dtella
- Gehyra montium Storr, 1982 – Centralian dtella
- Gehyra moritzi Hutchinson et al., 2014
- Gehyra multiporosa Doughty et al., 2012
- Gehyra mutilata (Wiegmann, 1834) – common four-clawed gecko, stump-toed gecko
- Gehyra nana Storr, 1978 – northern spotted rock dtella
- Gehyra occidentalis King, 1984 – Kimberley Plateau dtella
- Gehyra oceanica (Lesson, 1830) – Pacific dtella
- Gehyra ocellata Kealley, Doughty, Pepper, Keogh, Hillyer & Huey, 2018 – Pilbara island gehyra
- Gehyra pamela King, 1982 – Arnhemland watercourse dtella
- Gehyra papuana A. Meyer, 1874 – Papua dtella
- Gehyra paranana Bourke, Doughty, Tedeschi, Oliver & Moritz, 2018 – Litchfield spotted gecko
- Gehyra peninsularis Doughty, Bauer, Pepper & Keogh, 2018 – Burrup Peninsula rock gehyra
- Gehyra pilbara Mitchell, 1965 – Pilbara dtella
- Gehyra pluraporosa Bourke, Doughty, Tedeschi, Oliver, Myers & Moritz, 2018 – northern Kimberley gecko
- Gehyra polka Doughty, Bauer, Pepper & Keogh, 2018 – large-spotted midwest rock gehyra
- Gehyra pseudopunctata Bourke, Doughty, Tedeschi, Oliver & Moritz, 2018 – southern Kimberley spotted gecko
- Gehyra pulingka Hutchinson et al., 2014
- Gehyra punctata (Fry, 1914) – spotted dtella
- Gehyra purpurascens Storr, 1982 – purplish dtella
- Gehyra robusta King, 1984 – robust dtella
- Gehyra rohan Oliver, Clegg, Fisher, Richards, P.N. Taylor & Jocque, 2016
- Gehyra serraticauda Skipwith & Oliver, 2014
- Gehyra spheniscus Doughty et al., 2012 – small wedge-toed gecko
- Gehyra unguiculata Kealley, Doughty, Pepper, Keogh, Hillyer & Huey, 2018 – crescent-marked Pilbara gehyra
- Gehyra variegata (A.M.C. Duméril & Bibron, 1836) – tree dtella
- Gehyra versicolor Hutchinson et al., 2014
- Gehyra vorax Girard, 1858 – voracious dtella
- Gehyra wongchan Pauwels, Meesook, Kunya, Donbundit, & Sumontha, 2022
- Gehyra xenopus Storr, 1978 – crocodile-faced dtella
- Gehyra shiva Worawitoo Meesook, Nattasuda Donbundit, Tanasak Jindamad, Nittaya Topai, Kirati Kunya, Winai Suthanthangjai, Maneerat Suthanthangjai, Natthaphat Chotjuckdikul, Teeraphat Chonkamnord, Montri Sumontha, and Olivier S. G. Pauwels, 2025 – Shiva four-clawed gecko
- Gehyra aquilonia Kraus, 2024 – North Papuan Stump-toed Gecko
- Gehyra chrysopeleia Kraus, 2024 – Sudest Stump-toed Gecko
- Gehyra corona Kraus, Vahtera & Weijola, 2024 – Crown Island Stump-toed Gecko

Nota bene: A binomial authority in parentheses indicates that the species was originally described in a genus other than Gehyra.
