= Northern Kimberley gecko =

Scientific classification
- Kingdom: Animalia
- Phylum: Chordata
- Class: Reptilia
- Order: Squamata
- Suborder: Gekkota
- Family: Gekkonidae
- Genus: Gehyra
- Species: G. pluraporosa

Binomial name
- Gehyra pluraporosa Bourke, Doughty, Tedeschi, Oliver, Myers, & Moritz, 2018

Species of lizard

The northern Kimberley gecko (Gehyra pluraporosa) is a species of gecko in the genus Gehyra. It is endemic to Western Australia.
