= Kimberley karst gecko =

Conservation status
- Least Concern (IUCN 3.1)

Scientific classification
- Kingdom: Animalia
- Phylum: Chordata
- Class: Reptilia
- Order: Squamata
- Suborder: Gekkota
- Family: Gekkonidae
- Genus: Gehyra
- Species: G. girloorloo

Binomial name
- Gehyra girloorloo Oliver, Bourke, Pratt, Doughty, & Moritz, 2016

Species of lizard

The Kimberley karst gecko (Gehyra girloorloo) is a species of gecko endemic to Western Australia.
