= Einasleigh rock dtella =

Scientific classification
- Kingdom: Animalia
- Phylum: Chordata
- Class: Reptilia
- Order: Squamata
- Suborder: Gekkota
- Family: Gekkonidae
- Genus: Gehyra
- Species: G. einasleighensis

Binomial name
- Gehyra einasleighensis Bourke, Pratt, Vanderduys, & Moritz, 2017

Species of lizard

The Einasleigh rock dtella (Gehyra einasleighensis) is a species of gecko in the genus Gehyra, native to Queensland in Australia, and first described in 2017.
