= Southern Kimberley spotted gecko =

Scientific classification
- Kingdom: Animalia
- Phylum: Chordata
- Class: Reptilia
- Order: Squamata
- Suborder: Gekkota
- Family: Gekkonidae
- Genus: Gehyra
- Species: G. pseudopunctata

Binomial name
- Gehyra pseudopunctata Bourke, Doughty, Tedeschi, Oliver, & Moritz, 2018

Species of gecko

The southern Kimberley spotted gecko (Gehyra pseudopunctata) is a species of gecko in the genus Gehyra. It is endemic to Western Australia.
