= Gehyra calcitectus =

Scientific classification
- Domain: Eukaryota
- Kingdom: Animalia
- Phylum: Chordata
- Class: Reptilia
- Order: Squamata
- Infraorder: Gekkota
- Family: Gekkonidae
- Genus: Gehyra
- Species: G. calcitectus

Binomial name
- Gehyra calcitectus Oliver, Prasetya, Tedeschi, Fenker, Ellis, Doughty, & Moritz, 2020

Species of lizard

The relictual karst gehyra (Gehyra calcitectus) is a species of gecko. It is endemic to Western Australia.
