= Kimberley Plateau dtella =

Conservation status
- Least Concern (IUCN 3.1)

Scientific classification
- Kingdom: Animalia
- Phylum: Chordata
- Class: Reptilia
- Order: Squamata
- Suborder: Gekkota
- Family: Gekkonidae
- Genus: Gehyra
- Species: G. occidentalis

Binomial name
- Gehyra occidentalis King, 1984

Synonyms
- Dactyloperus occidentalis; Phyriadoria occidentalis

Species of lizard

The Kimberley Plateau dtella (Gehyra occidentalis) is a species of gecko endemic to Western Australia.
