= Pacific stump-toed gecko =

Scientific classification
- Kingdom: Animalia
- Phylum: Chordata
- Order: Squamata
- Suborder: Gekkota
- Family: Gekkonidae
- Genus: Gehyra
- Species: G. insulensis

Binomial name
- Gehyra insulensis (Girard, 1858)

Synonyms
- Dactyloperus insulensis

Species of lizard

The Pacific stump-toed gecko (Gehyra insulensis) is a species of gecko found on Rarotonga, Tonga, and Micronesia. It has been synonymized with Gehyra mutilata by many previous authors but more recently accepted as a valid species.
