= Western cryptic gehyra =

Scientific classification
- Kingdom: Animalia
- Phylum: Chordata
- Class: Reptilia
- Order: Squamata
- Suborder: Gekkota
- Family: Gekkonidae
- Genus: Gehyra
- Species: G. crypta

Binomial name
- Gehyra crypta Kealley, Doughty, Pepper, Keogh, Hillyer, & Huey, 2018

Species of lizard

Holotype site

The western cryptic gehyra (Gehyra crypta) is a species of gecko in the genus Gehyra. It is endemic to Western Australia. It was first described in 2018.
