= Hamersley Range spotted gehyra =

Scientific classification
- Kingdom: Animalia
- Phylum: Chordata
- Class: Reptilia
- Order: Squamata
- Suborder: Gekkota
- Family: Gekkonidae
- Genus: Gehyra
- Species: G. fenestrula

Binomial name
- Gehyra fenestrula Doughty, Bauer, Pepper, & Keogh, 2018

Species of lizard

The Hamersley Range spotted gehyra (Gehyra fenestrula) is a species of gecko in the genus Gehyra. It is endemic to Western Australia. It was first described in 2018.
