= Gehyra papuana =

Conservation status
- Least Concern (IUCN 3.1)

Scientific classification
- Kingdom: Animalia
- Phylum: Chordata
- Class: Reptilia
- Order: Squamata
- Suborder: Gekkota
- Family: Gekkonidae
- Genus: Gehyra
- Species: G. papuana

Binomial name
- Gehyra papuana Meyer, 1874

Synonyms
- Gehyra lampei; Peropus papuanus; Peropus papuana

Species of lizard

Gehyra papuana, also known as the Papua four-clawed gecko or Papua dtella, is a species of gecko endemic to New Guinea. It occurs in both Papua New Guinea and Western New Guinea (Indonesia).
