= Banda Island dtella =

Conservation status
- Least Concern (IUCN 3.1)

Scientific classification
- Domain: Eukaryota
- Kingdom: Animalia
- Phylum: Chordata
- Class: Reptilia
- Order: Squamata
- Infraorder: Gekkota
- Family: Gekkonidae
- Genus: Gehyra
- Species: G. barea

Binomial name
- Gehyra barea Kopstein, 1926
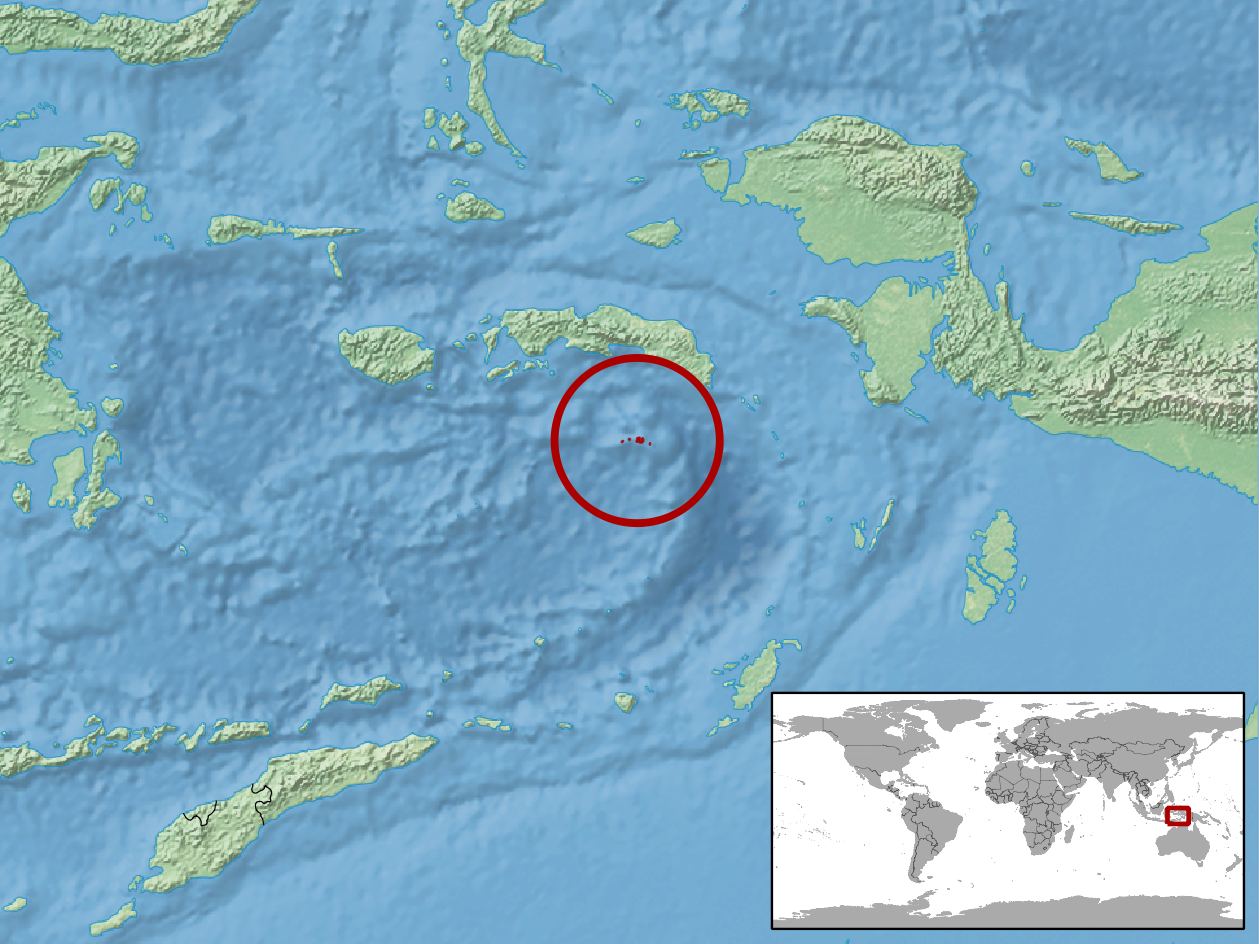

Synonyms
- Peropus barea

Species of lizard

The Banda Island dtella (Gehyra barea) is a species of gecko in the genus Gehyra, native to the Banda Islands.
