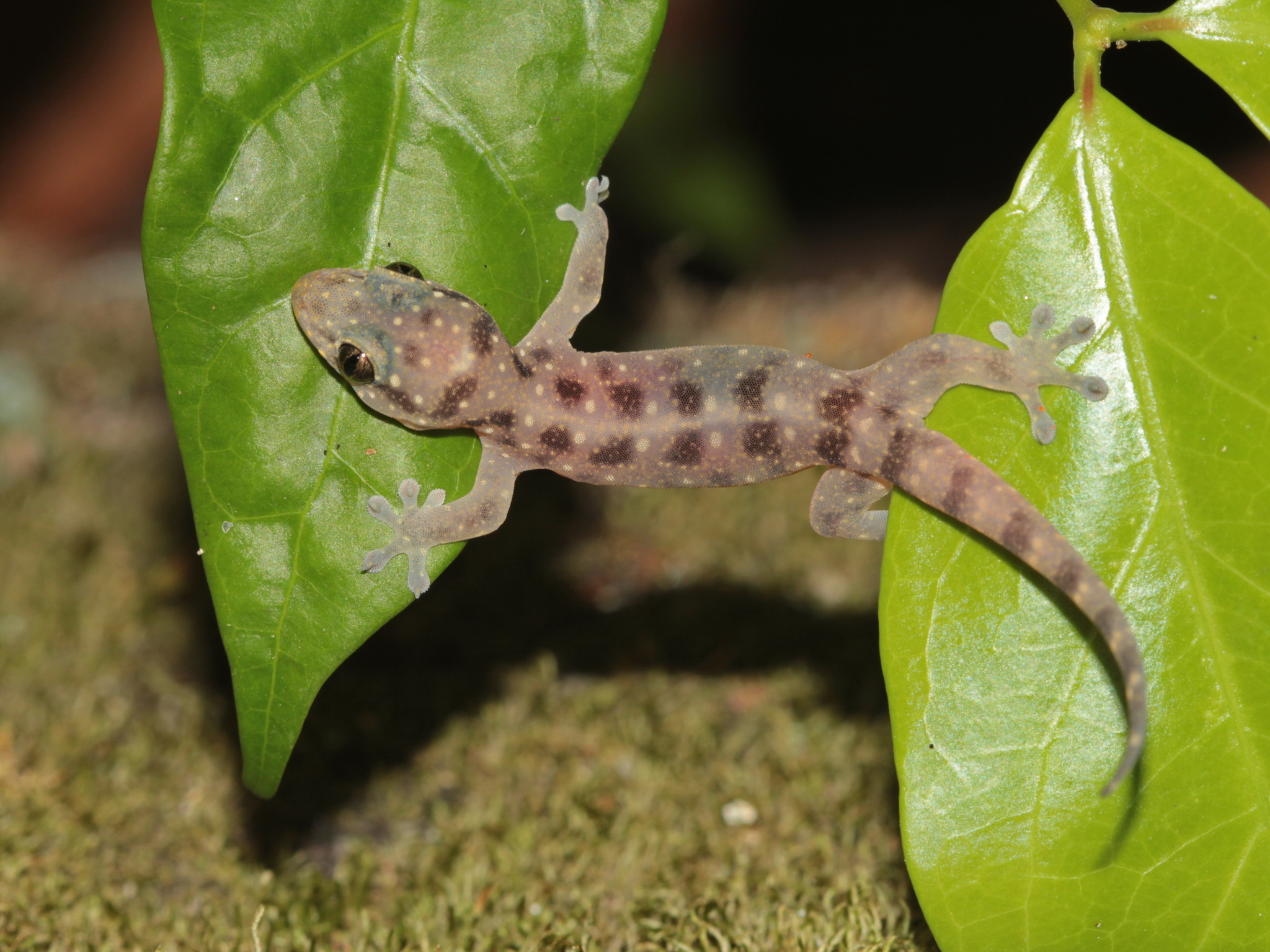
- Gehyra fehlmanni

Conservation status
- Least Concern (IUCN 3.1)

Scientific classification
- Kingdom: Animalia
- Phylum: Chordata
- Class: Reptilia
- Order: Squamata
- Suborder: Gekkota
- Family: Gekkonidae
- Genus: Gehyra
- Species: G. fehlmanni

Binomial name
- Gehyra fehlmanni (Taylor, 1962)

Synonyms
- Peropus fehlmanni Taylor, 1962; Gehyra fehlmanni — Kluge, 1993

= Gehyra fehlmanni =

Species of lizard

Gehyra fehlmanni, also known commonly as Fehlmann's dtella or Fehlmann's four-clawed gecko, is a species of lizard in the family Gekkonidae. The species is native to Southeast Asia.

== Etymology ==
The specific name, fehlmanni, is in honor of American ichthyologist Hermann Adair Fehlmann.

== Geographic range ==
G. fehlmanni is found in Thailand and Vietnam.

== Habitat ==
The preferred natural habitats of G. fehlmanni are forest and rocky areas.

== Description ==
Not a large gecko, G. fehlmanni may attain a snout-to-vent length of 4 cm (1.6 in), and a total length (including tail) of about 7 cm (2.8 in).

== Behavior ==
G. fehlmanni is terrestrial and nocturnal.

== Reproduction ==
G. fehlmanni is oviparous.
