= Palau Island dtella =

Conservation status
- Least Concern (IUCN 3.1)

Scientific classification
- Kingdom: Animalia
- Phylum: Chordata
- Class: Reptilia
- Order: Squamata
- Suborder: Gekkota
- Family: Gekkonidae
- Genus: Gehyra
- Species: G. brevipalmata

Binomial name
- Gehyra brevipalmata (Peters, 1874)
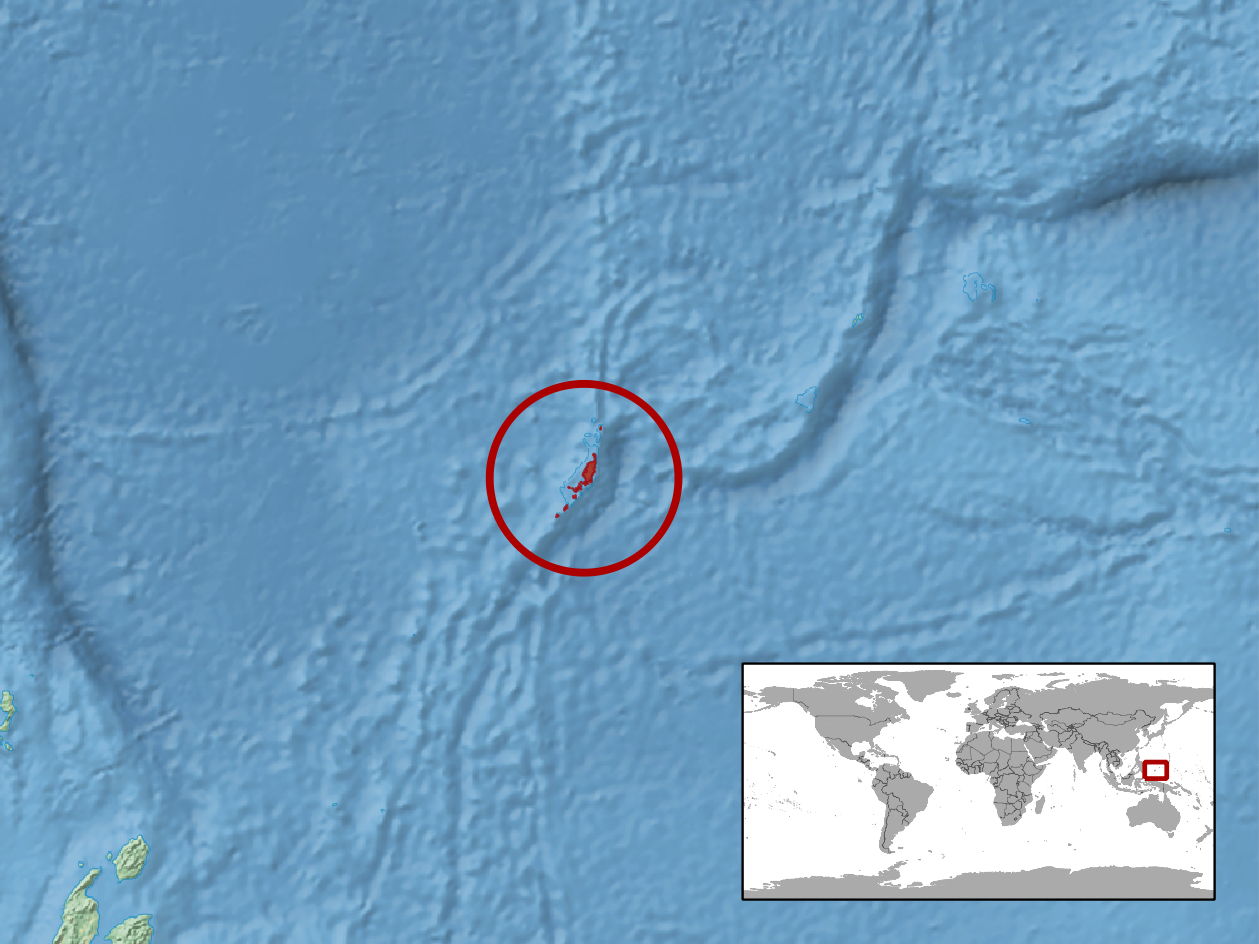

Synonyms
- Hemidactylus brevipalmatus Peters, 1874; Peropus brevipalmatus (Peters, 1874)

Species of lizard

The Palau Island dtella (Gehyra brevipalmata) is a species of gecko. It is endemic to the Palau Islands.
