= Gehyra punctata =

Conservation status
- Least Concern (IUCN 3.1)

Scientific classification
- Kingdom: Animalia
- Phylum: Chordata
- Class: Reptilia
- Order: Squamata
- Suborder: Gekkota
- Family: Gekkonidae
- Genus: Gehyra
- Species: G. punctata

Binomial name
- Gehyra punctata (Fry, 1914)

Synonyms
- Peropus variegatus punctatus; Gehyra variegatus punctatus; Gehyra fenestra; Dactyloperus punctata; Dactyloperus punctatus

Species of lizard

Gehyra punctata, also known as the spotted dtella or the spotted gecko, is a species of gecko endemic to Western Australia.
