= Gehyra koira =

Conservation status
- Least Concern (IUCN 3.1)

Scientific classification
- Kingdom: Animalia
- Phylum: Chordata
- Class: Reptilia
- Order: Squamata
- Suborder: Gekkota
- Family: Gekkonidae
- Genus: Gehyra
- Species: G. koira

Binomial name
- Gehyra koira Horner, 2005

Species of lizard

Gehyra koira is a species of gecko in the genus Gehyra, endemic to Western Australia and the Northern Territory.
