= Pilbara dtella =

Conservation status
- Least Concern (IUCN 3.1)

Scientific classification
- Kingdom: Animalia
- Phylum: Chordata
- Class: Reptilia
- Order: Squamata
- Suborder: Gekkota
- Family: Gekkonidae
- Genus: Gehyra
- Species: G. pilbara

Binomial name
- Gehyra pilbara Mitchell, 1965
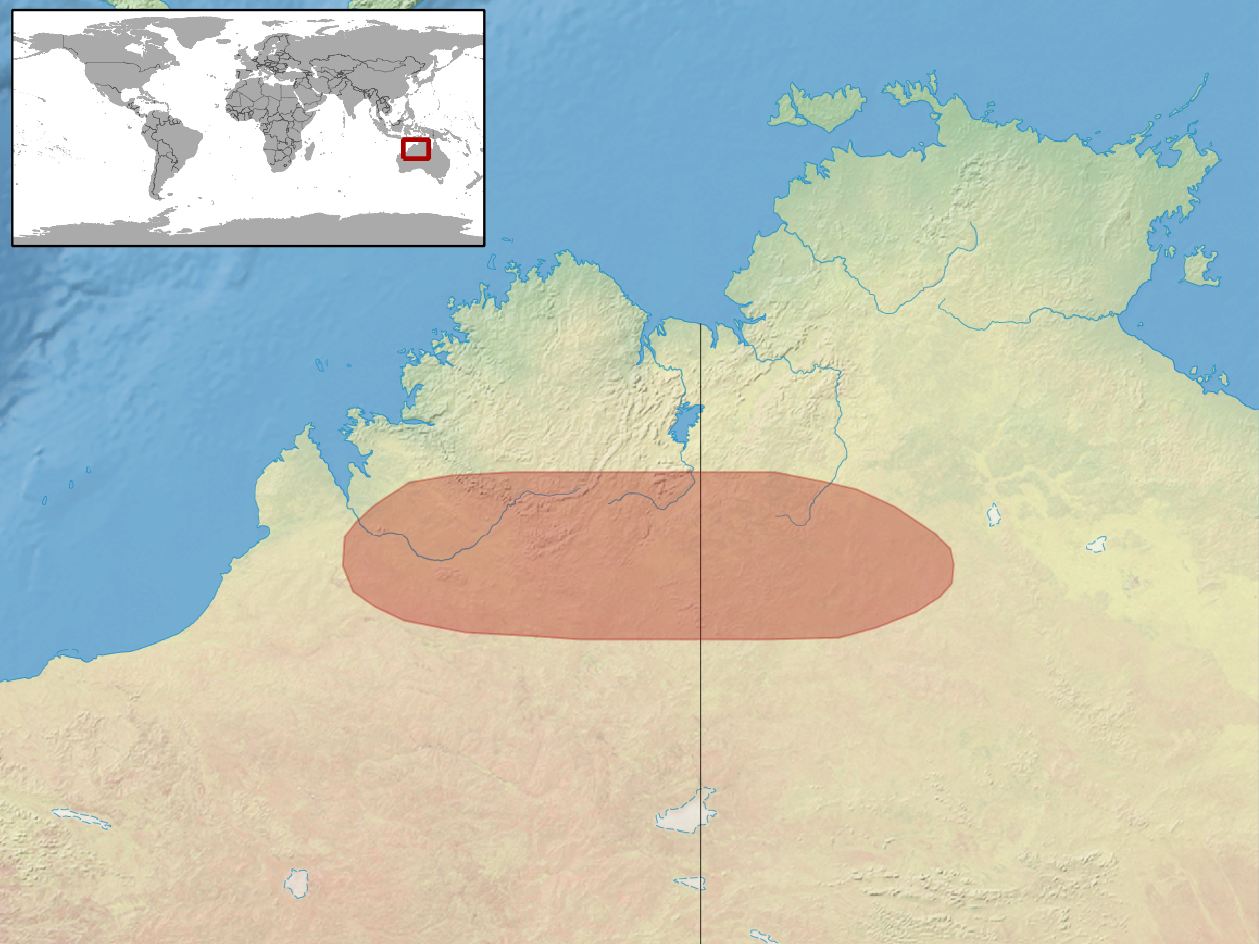

Synonyms
- Gehyra cognata; Gehyra cognatus; Dactyloperus cognata; Dactyloperus pilbara

Species of gecko

The Pilbara dtella (Gehyra pilbara) is a species of gecko endemic to Australia.
