= Gehyra electrum =

Scientific classification
- Kingdom: Animalia
- Phylum: Chordata
- Class: Reptilia
- Order: Squamata
- Suborder: Gekkota
- Family: Gekkonidae
- Genus: Gehyra
- Species: G. electrum

Binomial name
- Gehyra electrum Zozaya, Fenker, & Macdonald, 2019

Species of lizard

The amber rock dtella (Gehyra electrum) is a species of gecko in the genus Gehyra. It is endemic to northeastern Queensland in Australia.
