= Gehyra rohan =

Scientific classification
- Kingdom: Animalia
- Phylum: Chordata
- Class: Reptilia
- Order: Squamata
- Suborder: Gekkota
- Family: Gekkonidae
- Genus: Gehyra
- Species: G. rohan

Binomial name
- Gehyra rohan Oliver, Clegg, Fisher, Richards, Taylor, & Jocque, 2016

Species of lizard

Gehyra rohan is a species of gecko endemic to Papua New Guinea.
