= Small wedge-toed gecko =

Conservation status
- Least Concern (IUCN 3.1)

Scientific classification
- Kingdom: Animalia
- Phylum: Chordata
- Order: Squamata
- Suborder: Gekkota
- Family: Gekkonidae
- Genus: Gehyra
- Species: G. spheniscus

Binomial name
- Gehyra spheniscus Doughty, Palmer, Sistrom, Bauer, & Donnellan, 2012

Species of lizard

The small wedge-toed gecko (Gehyra spheniscus) is a species of gecko endemic to Western Australia.
