= Gehyra serraticauda =

Conservation status
- Data Deficient (IUCN 3.1)

Scientific classification
- Kingdom: Animalia
- Phylum: Chordata
- Class: Reptilia
- Order: Squamata
- Suborder: Gekkota
- Family: Gekkonidae
- Genus: Gehyra
- Species: G. serraticauda

Binomial name
- Gehyra serraticauda Skipwith & Oliver, 2014

Species of lizard

Gehyra serraticauda is a species of gecko endemic to Western New Guinea in Indonesia.
