= Gehyra lauta =

Scientific classification
- Domain: Eukaryota
- Kingdom: Animalia
- Phylum: Chordata
- Class: Reptilia
- Order: Squamata
- Infraorder: Gekkota
- Family: Gekkonidae
- Genus: Gehyra
- Species: G. lauta

Binomial name
- Gehyra lauta Oliver, Prasetya, Tedeschi, Fenker, Ellis, Doughty, & Moritz, 2020

Species of lizard

The Gulf tree gehyra (Gehyra lauta) is a species of gecko, also known as the ghost gecko. It is endemic to Queensland, and to the Northern Territory in Australia.
