= Narrow-tailed four-clawed gecko =

Scientific classification
- Domain: Eukaryota
- Kingdom: Animalia
- Phylum: Chordata
- Class: Reptilia
- Order: Squamata
- Infraorder: Gekkota
- Family: Gekkonidae
- Genus: Gehyra
- Species: G. Angusticaudata

Binomial name
- Gehyra Angusticaudata (Taylor, 1963)

Synonyms
- Peropus angusticaudatus Taylor, 1963

Species of lizard

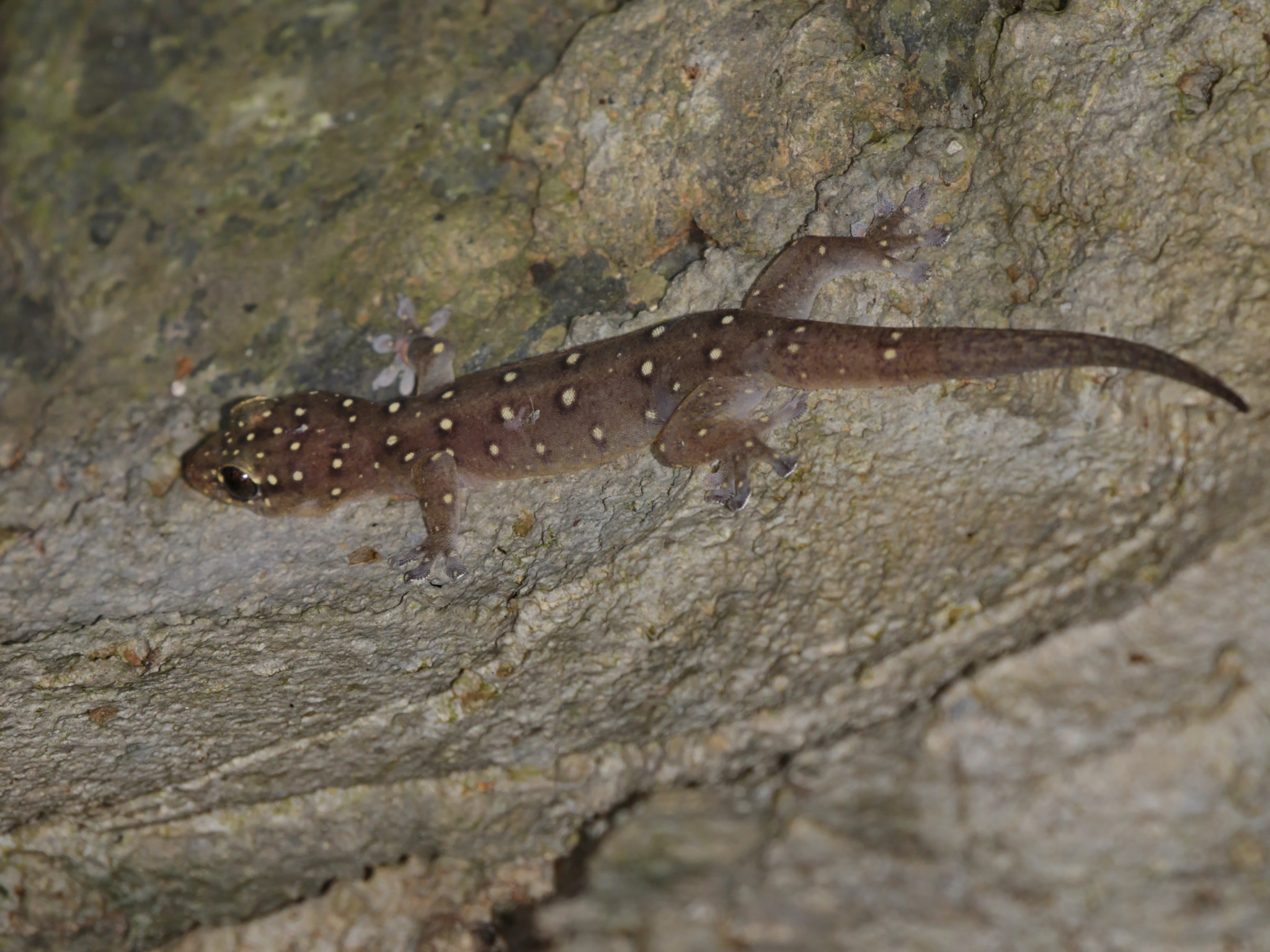
Narrow-tailed four-clawed gecko

The narrow-tailed four-clawed gecko or narrowhead dtella (Gehyra angusticaudata) is a species of gecko. It is endemic to eastern Thailand.
