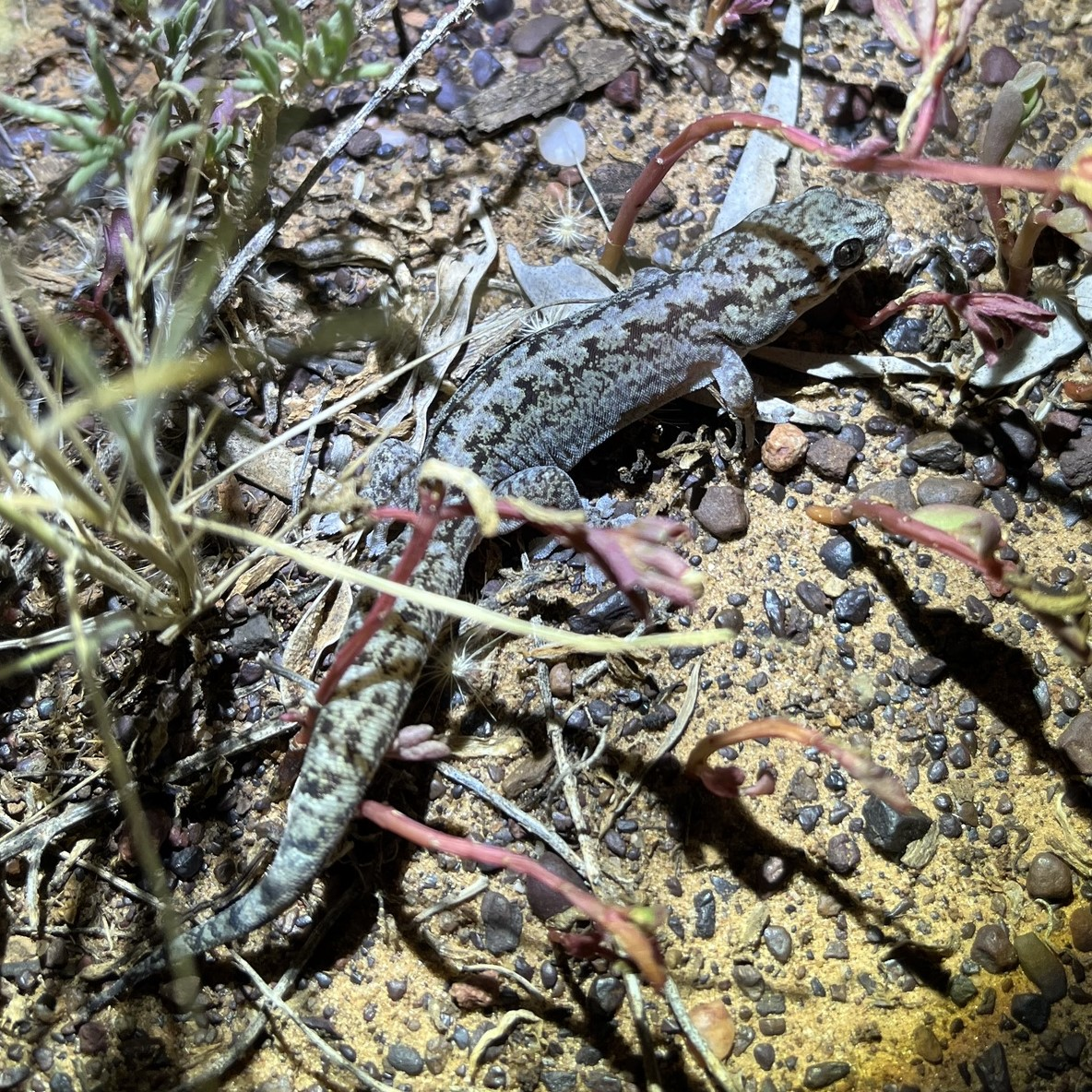

Scientific classification
- Domain: Eukaryota
- Kingdom: Animalia
- Phylum: Chordata
- Class: Reptilia
- Order: Squamata
- Infraorder: Gekkota
- Family: Gekkonidae
- Genus: Gehyra
- Species: G. catenata

Binomial name
- Gehyra catenata Low, 1979

Synonyms
- Dactyloperus catenata; Dactyloperus catenatus

= Chain-backed dtella =

Species of lizard

The chain-backed dtella (Gehyra catenata) is a species of gecko native to Queensland, Australia. It was first described by Timothy Low in 1979.
