= Gehyra multiporosa =

Conservation status
- Least Concern (IUCN 3.1)

Scientific classification
- Kingdom: Animalia
- Phylum: Chordata
- Class: Reptilia
- Order: Squamata
- Suborder: Gekkota
- Family: Gekkonidae
- Genus: Gehyra
- Species: G. multiporosa

Binomial name
- Gehyra multiporosa Hutchinson, Sistrom, Donnellan & Hutchinson, 2012

Species of lizard

Gehyra multiporosa is a species of gecko endemic to Western Australia.
