= Pilbara island gehyra =

Scientific classification
- Kingdom: Animalia
- Phylum: Chordata
- Class: Reptilia
- Order: Squamata
- Suborder: Gekkota
- Family: Gekkonidae
- Genus: Gehyra
- Species: G. ocellata

Binomial name
- Gehyra ocellata Kealley, Doughty, Pepper, Keogh, Hillyer, & Huey, 2018

Species of lizard

The Pilbara island gehyra (Gehyra ocellata) is a species of gecko in the genus Gehyra. It is endemic to Western Australia.
