= Small-spotted midwest rock gehyra =

Scientific classification
- Kingdom: Animalia
- Phylum: Chordata
- Class: Reptilia
- Order: Squamata
- Suborder: Gekkota
- Family: Gekkonidae
- Genus: Gehyra
- Species: G. finipunctata

Binomial name
- Gehyra finipunctata Doughty, Bauer, Pepper, Keogh, & Ellis, 2018

Species of lizard

The small-spotted midwest rock gehyra (Gehyra finipunctata) is a species of gecko in the genus Gehyra. It is endemic to Western Australia.
