= Dwarf dtella =

Scientific classification
- Domain: Eukaryota
- Kingdom: Animalia
- Phylum: Chordata
- Class: Reptilia
- Order: Squamata
- Infraorder: Gekkota
- Family: Gekkonidae
- Genus: Gehyra
- Species: G. minuta

Binomial name
- Gehyra minuta King, 1982

Synonyms
- Dactyloperus minutus

Species of lizard

The dwarf dtella (Gehyra minuta) is a species of gecko endemic to the Northern Territory in Australia.
