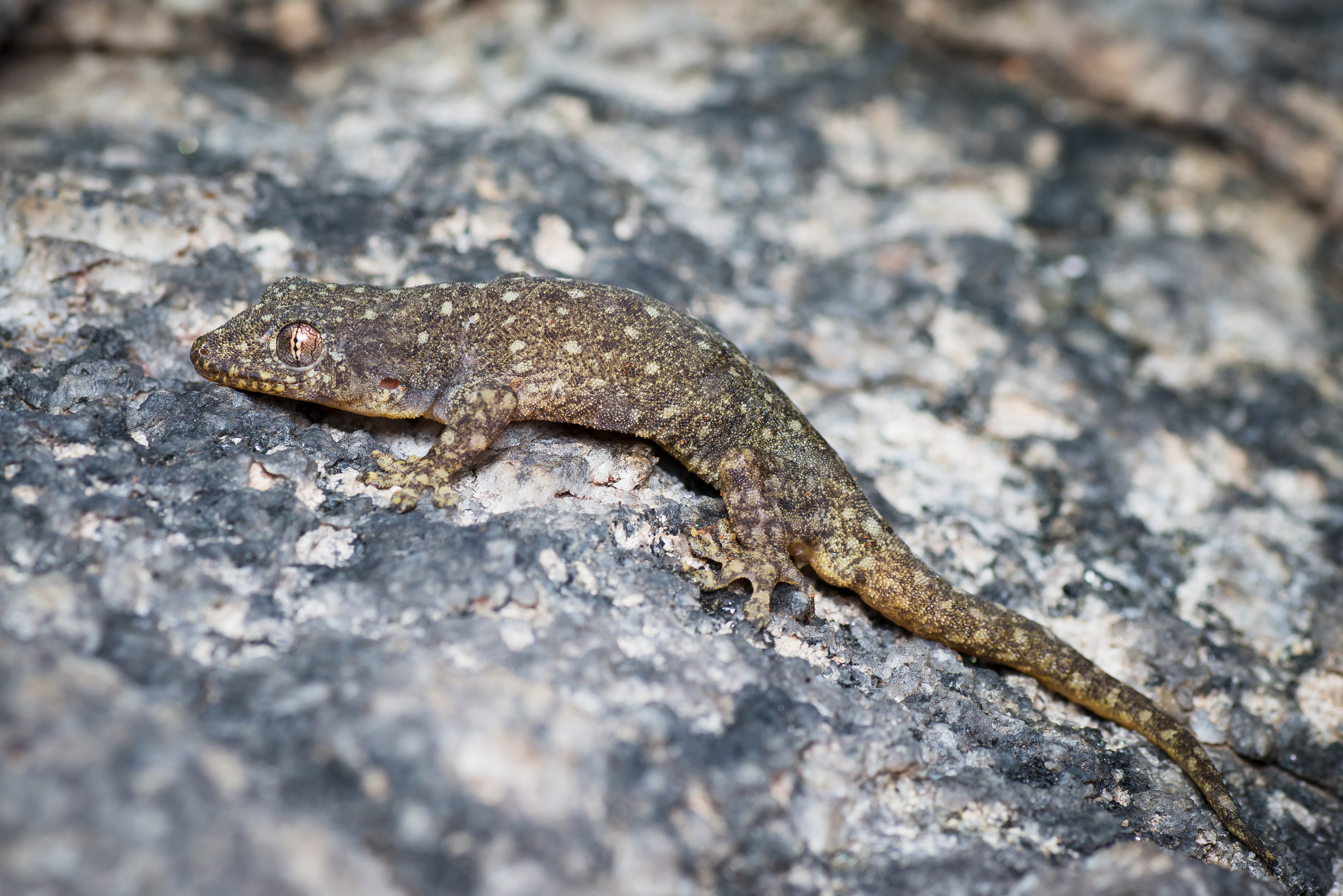

Scientific classification
- Kingdom: Animalia
- Phylum: Chordata
- Class: Reptilia
- Order: Squamata
- Suborder: Gekkota
- Family: Gekkonidae
- Genus: Gehyra
- Species: G. lacerata

Binomial name
- Gehyra lacerata (Taylor, 1962)

Synonyms
- Peropus laceratus Taylor, 1962; Gehyra laceratus (Taylor, 1962)

= Gehyra lacerata =

Species of lizard

Gehyra lacerata, also known as the lacerated dtella or the Kanchanaburi four-clawed gecko, is a species of gecko. It is native to Thailand and Vietnam.
