= Short-tailed dtella =

Scientific classification
- Domain: Eukaryota
- Kingdom: Animalia
- Phylum: Chordata
- Class: Reptilia
- Order: Squamata
- Infraorder: Gekkota
- Family: Gekkonidae
- Genus: Gehyra
- Species: G. baliola

Binomial name
- Gehyra baliola (Duméril, 1851)

Synonyms
- Hemidactylus baliolus; Peripia torresiana; Peripia marmorata; Peripia brevicaudis; Gehyra marmorata; Gehyra brevicaudis; Gehyra oceanica; Gehyra torresiana; Peropus baliolus

Species of lizard

The short-tailed dtella (Gehyra baliola) is a species of gecko in the genus Gehyra. It is endemic to the Torres Strait Islands and to Cape York Peninsula in Australia.
