= Gehyra chimera =

Scientific classification
- Domain: Eukaryota
- Kingdom: Animalia
- Phylum: Chordata
- Class: Reptilia
- Order: Squamata
- Infraorder: Gekkota
- Family: Gekkonidae
- Genus: Gehyra
- Species: G. chimera

Binomial name
- Gehyra chimera Oliver, Prasetya, Tedeschi, Fenker, Ellis, Doughty, & Moritz, 2020

Species of lizard

The western Kimberley tree gehyra (Gehyra chimera) is a species of gecko. It is endemic to Western Australia.
