= Gehyra kimberleyi =

Conservation status
- Least Concern (IUCN 3.1)

Scientific classification
- Kingdom: Animalia
- Phylum: Chordata
- Class: Reptilia
- Order: Squamata
- Suborder: Gekkota
- Family: Gekkonidae
- Genus: Gehyra
- Species: G. kimberleyi

Binomial name
- Gehyra kimberleyi Börner & Schüttler, 1983

Synonyms
- Gehyra kimberleyi Börner & Schüttler, 1983; Dactyloperus kimberleyi — Wells & Wellington, 1984; Gehyra kimberleyi — Kluge, 1993

Species of lizard

Gehyra kimberleyi, also known commonly as the Kimberley dtella, the robust termitaria dtella, and the robust termitaria gecko, is a species of gecko, a lizard in the family Gekkonidae. The species is endemic to western Australia.

== Etymology ==
The specific name, kimberleyi, refers to the Kimberley region of Western Australia.

== Description ==
G. kimberleyi usually has a snout-to vent length (SVL) of about 6 cm (2.4 in). It has 7–9 upper labials, and it has long narrow postmental scales. The expanded portion of the fourth toe has 6–9 subdigital lamellae, which are divided.

== Geographic range ==
G. kimberleyi is found in the northwestern part of the state of Western Australia.

== Habitat ==
The preferred habitat of G. kimberleyi is termite nests (termitaria).

== Reproduction ==
G. kimberleyi is oviparous.
