= Crocodile-faced dtella =

Conservation status
- Least Concern (IUCN 3.1)

Scientific classification
- Kingdom: Animalia
- Phylum: Chordata
- Class: Reptilia
- Order: Squamata
- Suborder: Gekkota
- Family: Gekkonidae
- Genus: Gehyra
- Species: G. xenopus

Binomial name
- Gehyra xenopus Storr, 1978

Species of lizard

The crocodile-faced dtella (Gehyra xenopus) is a species of gecko endemic to Western Australia. It was first described in 1978 by Glen Milton Storr.
