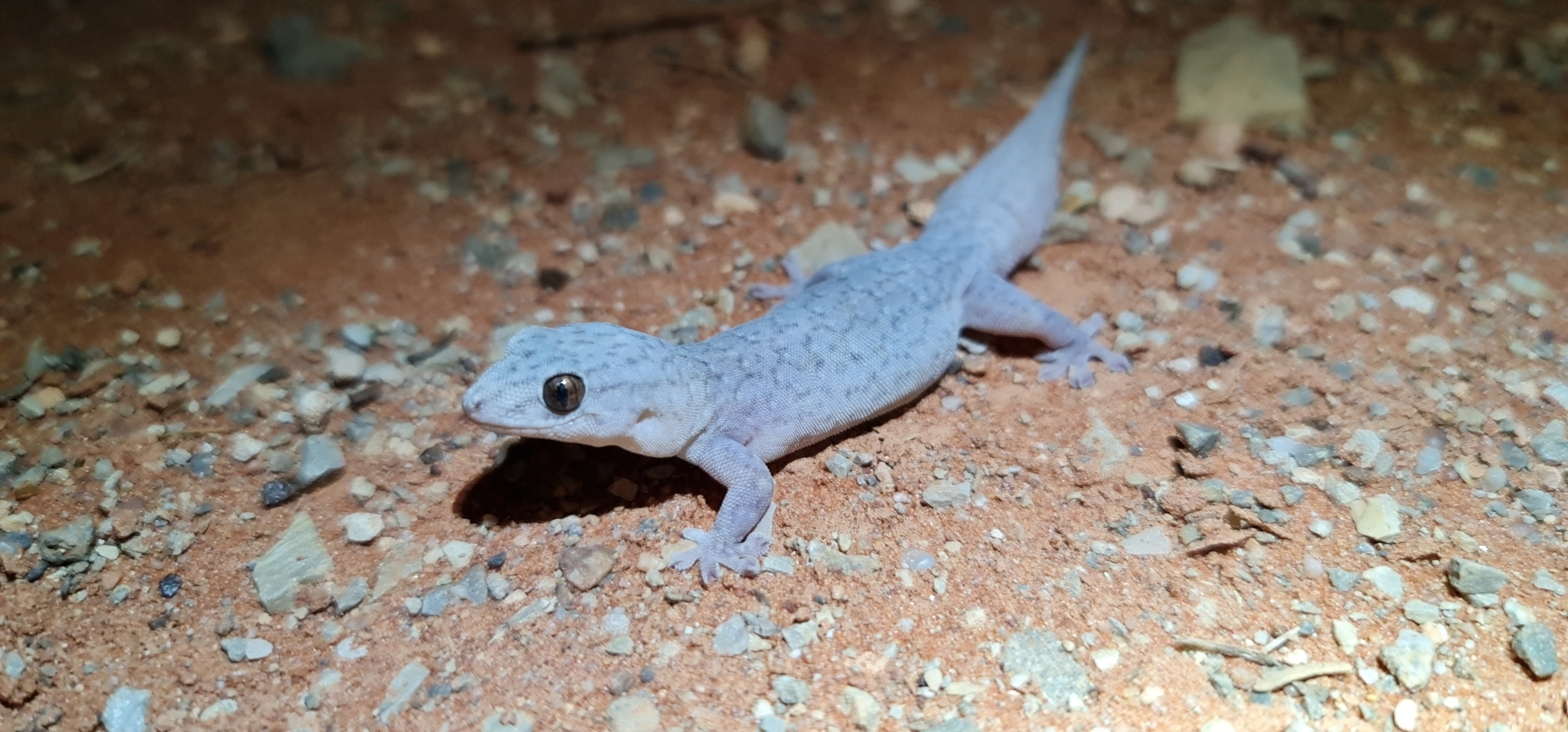

Conservation status
- Least Concern (IUCN 3.1)

Scientific classification
- Kingdom: Animalia
- Phylum: Chordata
- Class: Reptilia
- Order: Squamata
- Suborder: Gekkota
- Family: Gekkonidae
- Genus: Gehyra
- Species: G. purpurascens

Binomial name
- Gehyra purpurascens Storr, 1982

Synonyms
- Dactyloperus purpurascens

= Purplish dtella =

Species of lizard

The purplish dtella (Gehyra purpurascens) is a species of gecko endemic to Australia.
