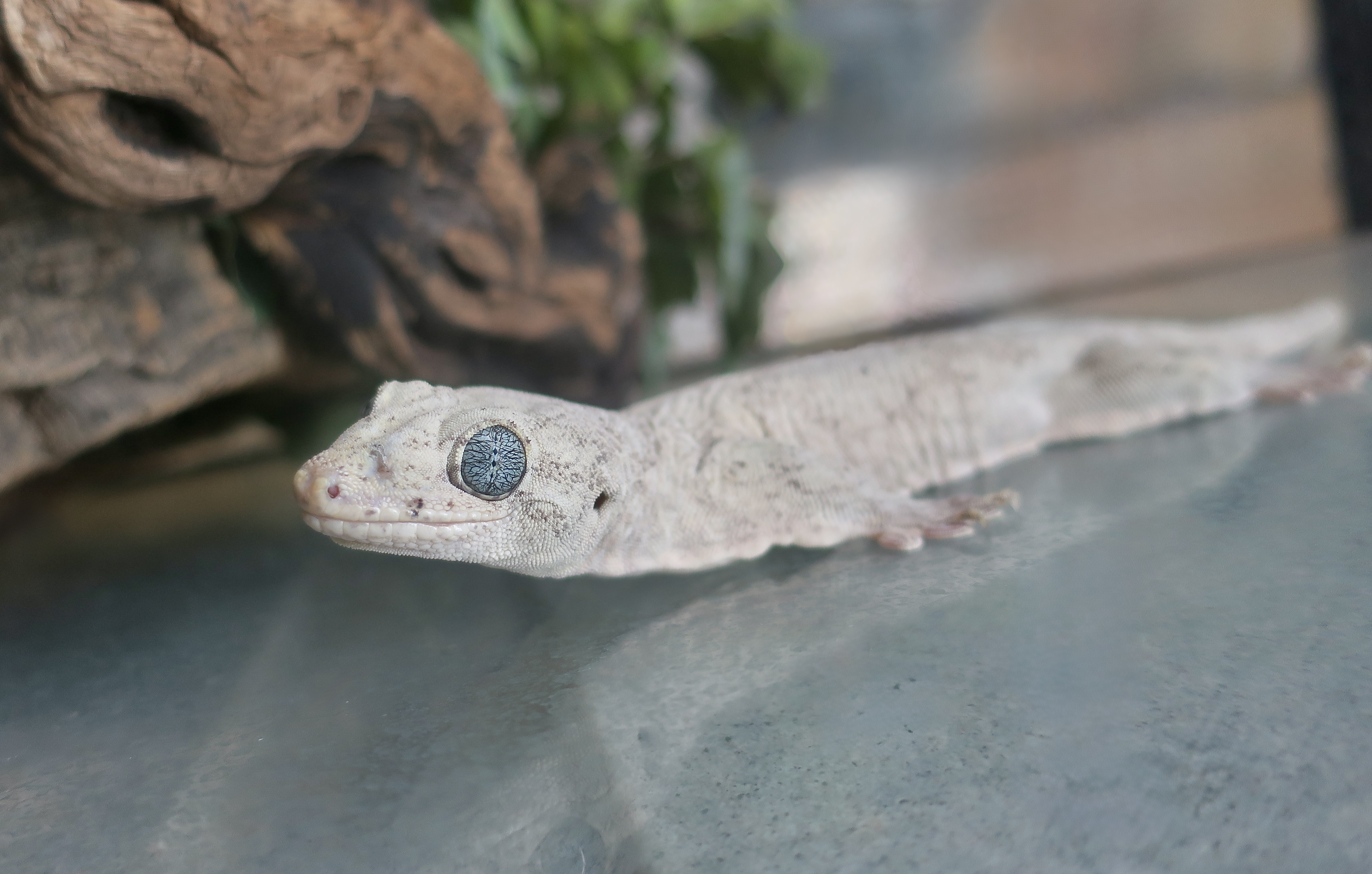

Scientific classification
- Kingdom: Animalia
- Phylum: Chordata
- Class: Reptilia
- Order: Squamata
- Suborder: Gekkota
- Family: Gekkonidae
- Genus: Gehyra
- Species: G. marginata

Binomial name
- Gehyra marginata Boulenger, 1887

Synonyms
- Gehyra fischeri

= Halmahera giant gecko =

Species of lizard

The Halmahera giant gecko (Gehyra marginata), also known as the Ternate dtella, is a species of gecko endemic to Indonesia.

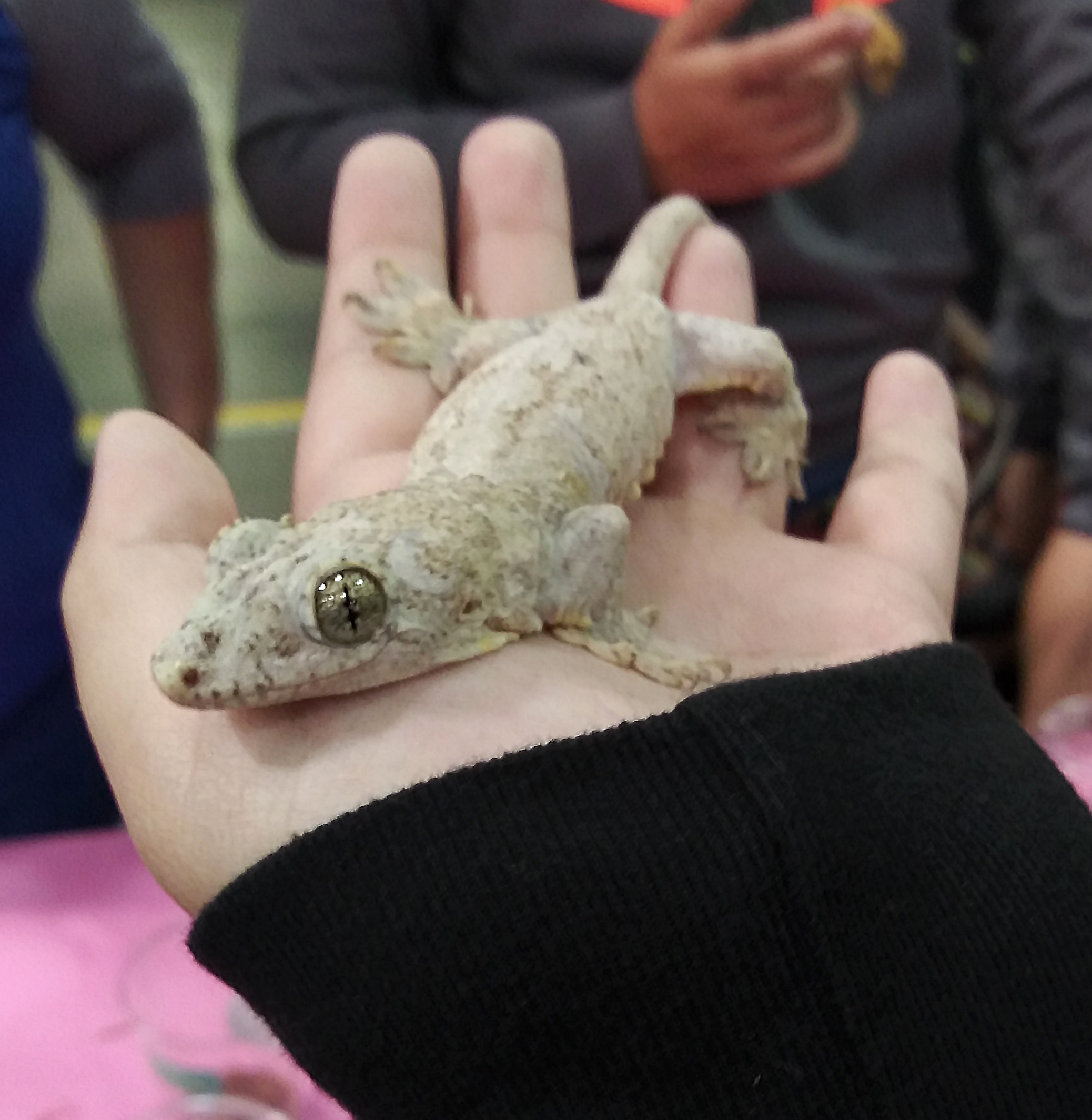
Halmahera giant gecko at Tampa Repticon, Feb 2020 (cropped)
