= Gehyra arnhemica =

Scientific classification
- Domain: Eukaryota
- Kingdom: Animalia
- Phylum: Chordata
- Class: Reptilia
- Order: Squamata
- Infraorder: Gekkota
- Family: Gekkonidae
- Genus: Gehyra
- Species: G. arnhemica

Binomial name
- Gehyra arnhemica Oliver, Prasetya, Tedeschi, Fenker, Ellis, Doughty, & Moritz, 2020

Species of lizard

The East Arnhem Land gehyra (Gehyra arnhemica) is a species of gecko. It is endemic to the Northern Territory of Australia. It was first described in 2020. The same paper which described Gehyra arnhemica also described five other species of Gehyra.

== Etymology ==
The epithet arnhemica refers to the Arnhem Land region of the Northern Territory, to which the species is endemic.
