= Gehyra ipsa =

Scientific classification
- Kingdom: Animalia
- Phylum: Chordata
- Class: Reptilia
- Order: Squamata
- Suborder: Gekkota
- Family: Gekkonidae
- Genus: Gehyra
- Species: G. ipsa

Binomial name
- Gehyra ipsa Horner, 2005

Species of lizard

The Bungle Bungle Ranges gehyra (Gehyra ipsa) is a species of gecko in the genus Gehyra, endemic to Western Australia.
