= Gehyra wongchan =

Scientific classification
- Kingdom: Animalia
- Phylum: Chordata
- Class: Reptilia
- Order: Squamata
- Suborder: Gekkota
- Family: Gekkonidae
- Genus: Gehyra
- Species: G. wongchan

Binomial name
- Gehyra wongchan Pauwels, Meesook, Kunya, Donbundit, & Sumontha, 2022

Species of lizard

Gehyra wongchan is a species of gecko endemic to Thailand.
