= Gehyra interstitialis =

Conservation status
- Data Deficient (IUCN 3.1)

Scientific classification
- Kingdom: Animalia
- Phylum: Chordata
- Class: Reptilia
- Order: Squamata
- Suborder: Gekkota
- Family: Gekkonidae
- Genus: Gehyra
- Species: G. interstitialis

Binomial name
- Gehyra interstitialis Oudemans, 1894

Synonyms
- Peropus interstitialis

Species of lizard

Gehyra interstitialis, also known as Oudemans's dtella or Oudemans's four-clawed gecko, is a species of gecko in the genus Gehyra, endemic to western Papua New Guinea.
