= Robust dtella =

Conservation status
- Least Concern (IUCN 3.1)

Scientific classification
- Kingdom: Animalia
- Phylum: Chordata
- Class: Reptilia
- Order: Squamata
- Suborder: Gekkota
- Family: Gekkonidae
- Genus: Gehyra
- Species: G. robusta

Binomial name
- Gehyra robusta King, 1984

Synonyms
- Dactyloperus robustus Wells and Wellington, 1985

Species of lizard

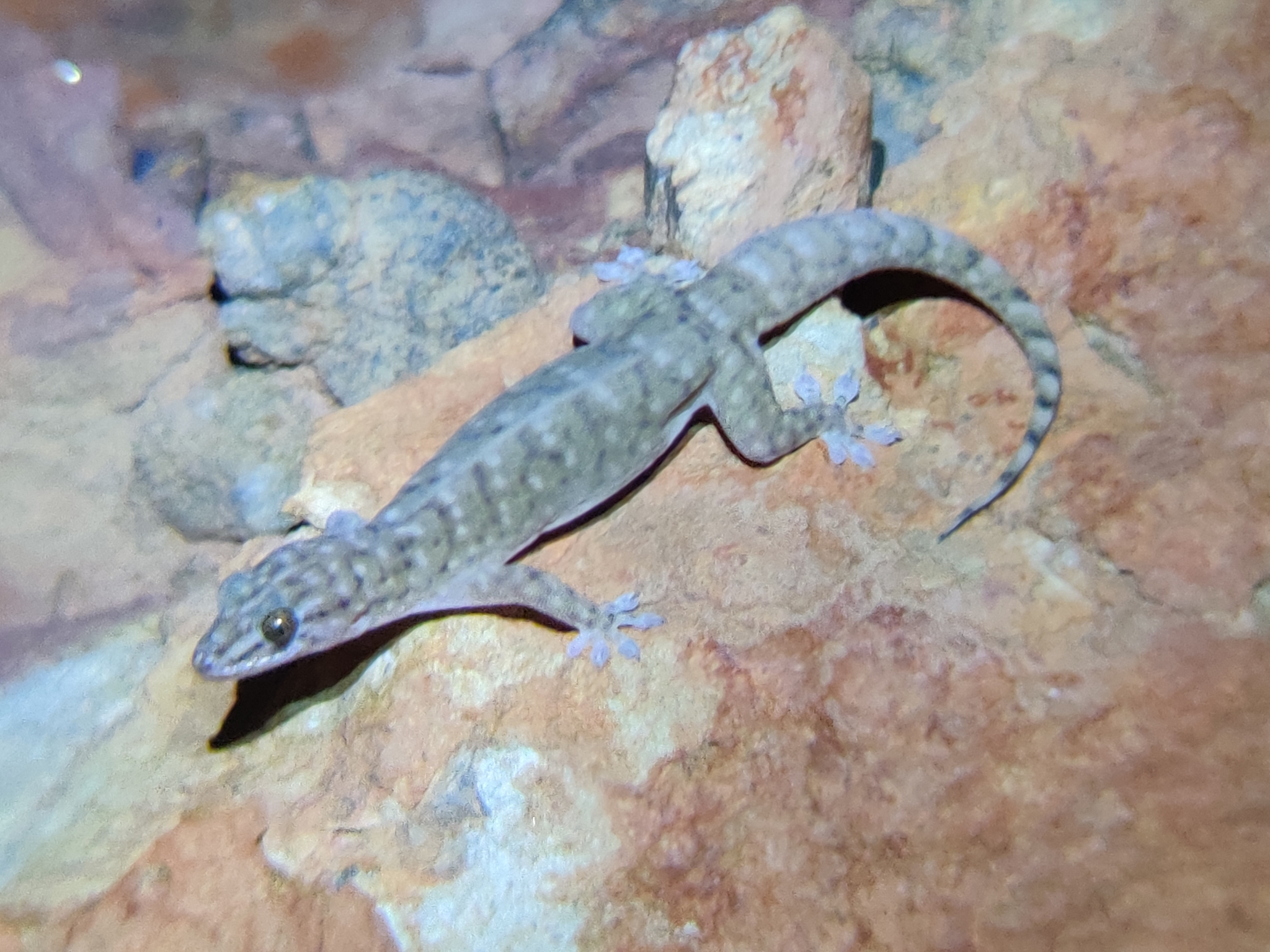
Robust Dtella (Gehyra robusta)

The robust dtella (Gehyra robusta) is a species of gecko endemic to Queensland in Australia.
