= Northern spotted rock dtella =

Conservation status
- Least Concern (IUCN 3.1)

Scientific classification
- Kingdom: Animalia
- Phylum: Chordata
- Class: Reptilia
- Order: Squamata
- Suborder: Gekkota
- Family: Gekkonidae
- Genus: Gehyra
- Species: G. nana

Binomial name
- Gehyra nana Storr, 1978

Synonyms
- Dactyloperus nana

Species of lizard

The northern spotted rock dtella (Gehyra nana) is a species of gecko endemic to Australia.
