= Centralian dtella =

Conservation status
- Least Concern (IUCN 3.1)

Scientific classification
- Kingdom: Animalia
- Phylum: Chordata
- Class: Reptilia
- Order: Squamata
- Suborder: Gekkota
- Family: Gekkonidae
- Genus: Gehyra
- Species: G. montium

Binomial name
- Gehyra montium Storr, 1982

Synonyms
- 'Dactyloperus montium

Species of lizard

The Centralian dtella (Gehyra montium) is a species of gecko endemic to Australia.
