= Borroloola dtella =

Conservation status
- Least Concern (IUCN 3.1)

Scientific classification
- Kingdom: Animalia
- Phylum: Chordata
- Class: Reptilia
- Order: Squamata
- Suborder: Gekkota
- Family: Gekkonidae
- Genus: Gehyra
- Species: G. borroloola

Binomial name
- Gehyra borroloola King, 1983
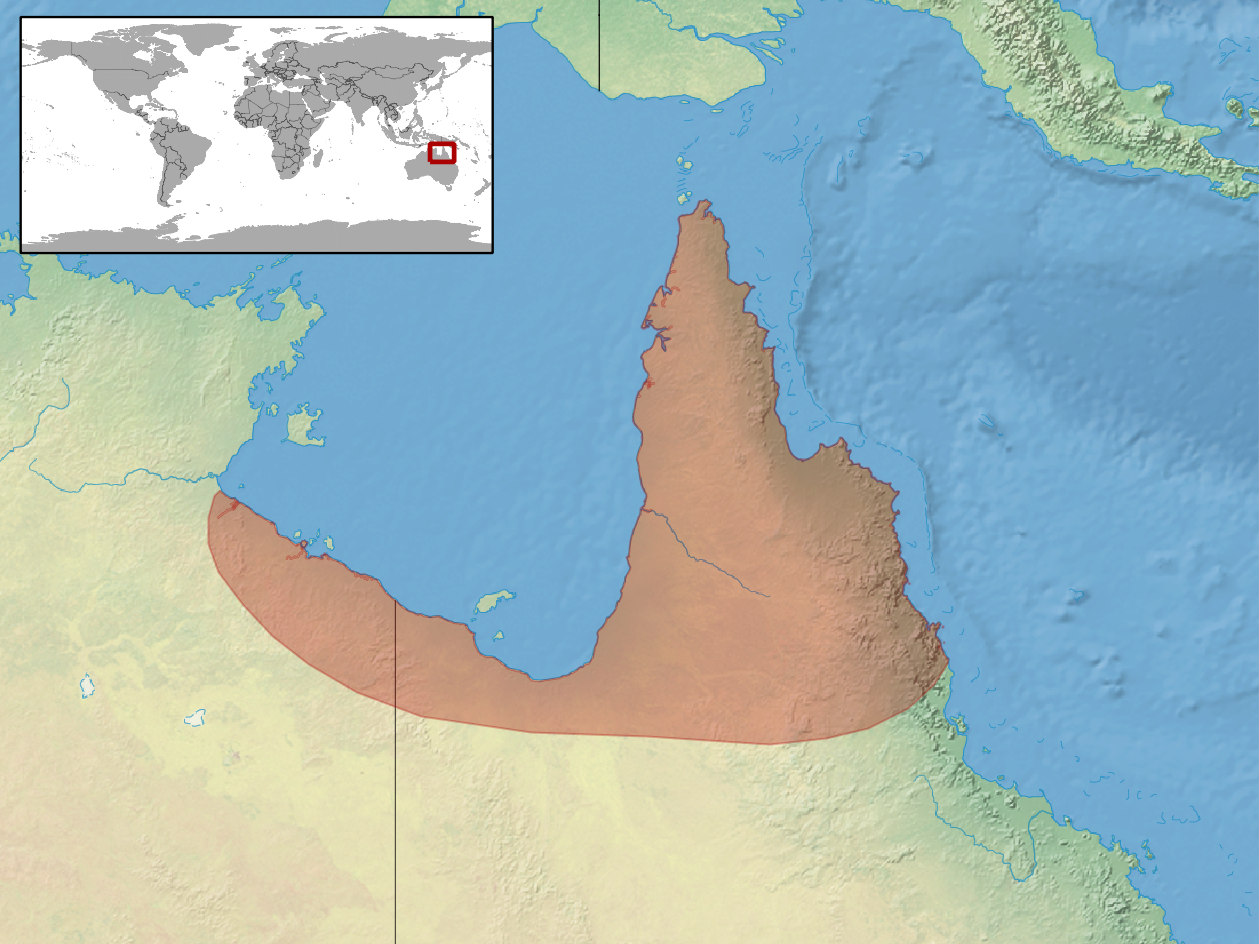

Synonyms
- Dactyloperus borroloola; Phyriadoria borroloola

Species of lizard

The Borroloola dtella (Gehyra borroloola) is a species of gecko in the genus Gehyra. It is endemic to Australia. It was first described in 1983 by Max King.
