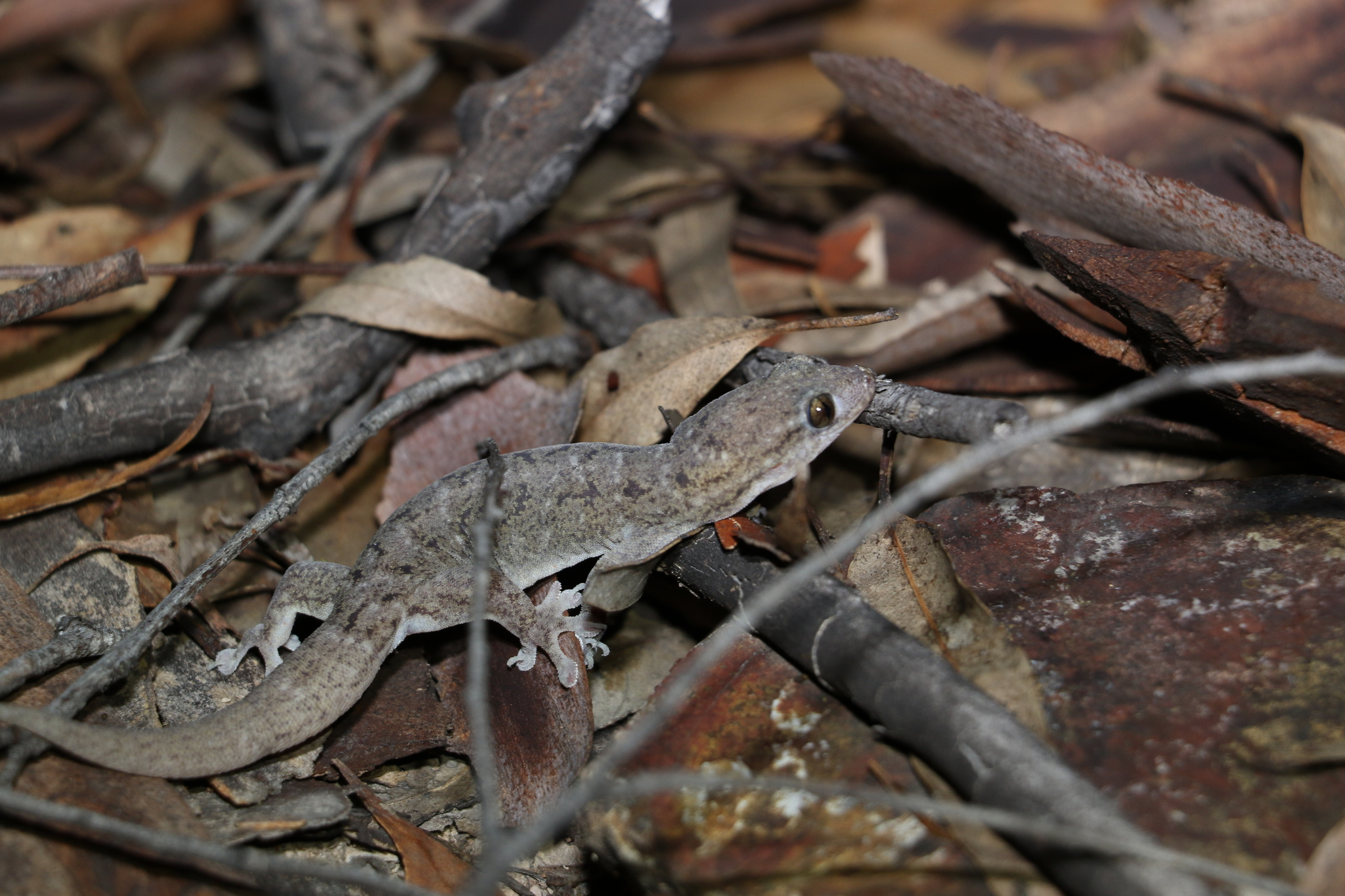

Conservation status
- Least Concern (IUCN 3.1)

Scientific classification
- Kingdom: Animalia
- Phylum: Chordata
- Class: Reptilia
- Order: Squamata
- Suborder: Gekkota
- Family: Gekkonidae
- Genus: Gehyra
- Species: G. dubia

Binomial name
- Gehyra dubia (Macleay, 1877)
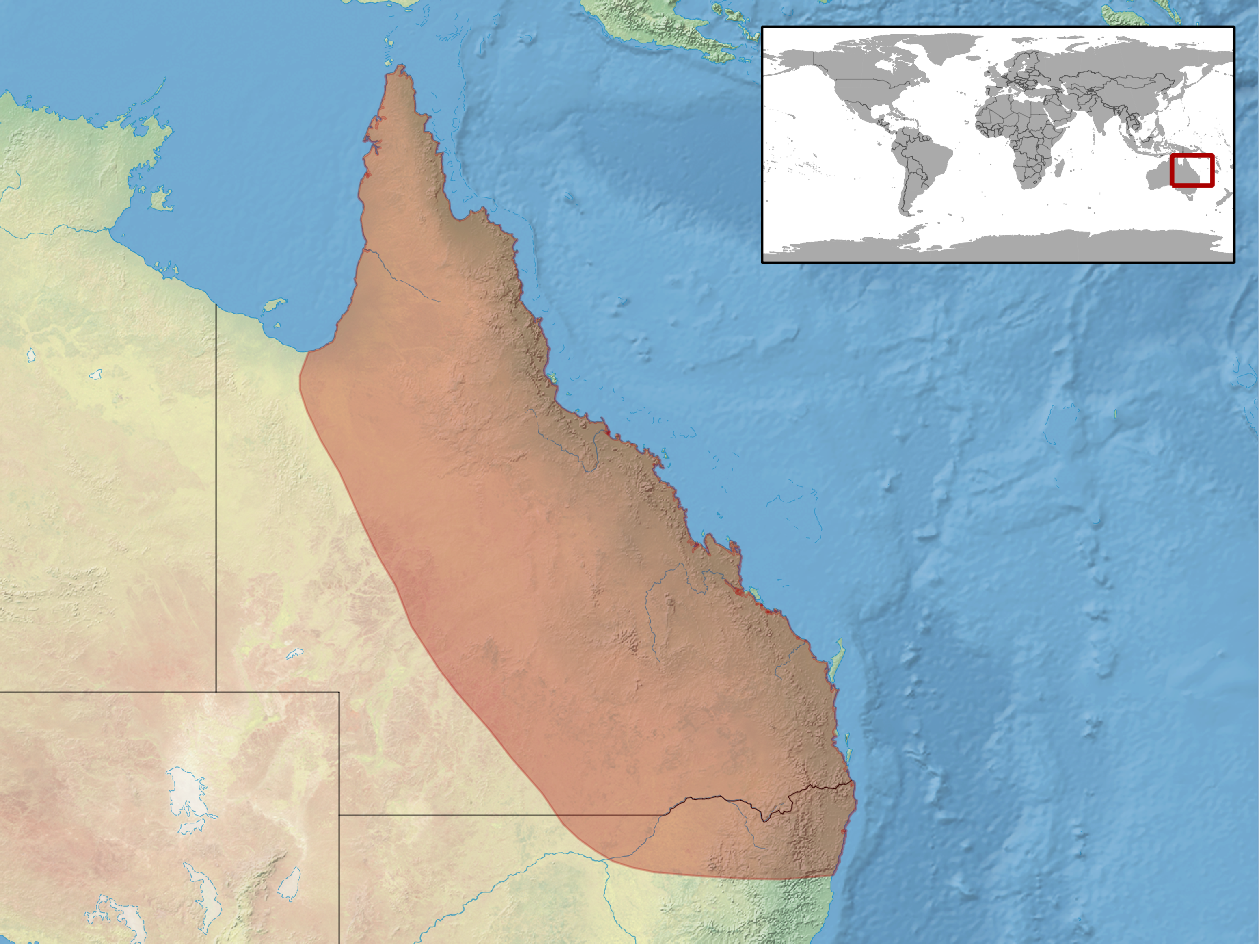

= Dubious dtella =

Species of lizard

The dubious dtella, native Australian house gecko, or dubious four-clawed gecko (Gehyra dubia) is a species of gecko in the genus Gehyra, native to northeastern Australia (Queensland and northern New South Wales as well as islands of the Great Barrier Reef and the Torres Strait). The lizard is found in a variety of habitats, including acacia and eucalyptus woodlands, and in human-developed habitats, such as house walls in urban areas. Its urban presence makes it known as a common house gecko in Queensland. These geckos are often confused with the Asian common house gecko, which was introduced to Australia from Indonesia, but G. dubia has distinct rounded feet and quieter calls.

== Physical description ==
Gehyra dubia is a small gecko; its snout-to-vent length ranges up to 6 cm, and its tail length ranging up to 14 cm. Body size does not vary significantly between the sexes. While resting, they are typically a dull gray-brown color and carry dark spots all over the dorsal side. It has a slight camouflage ability, and often changes to a lighter brown. When foraging, they lose the spots on their back. These geckos have four limbs, each complete with five digits. On each digit is situated a circular pad, which helps them grip surfaces. This contributes to their ability to succeed in a human house as a habitat; they can grip onto ceilings and glass windows. G. dubia lacks a claw on its inner digits. The skin on the gecko, even its tail, is smooth. This is one of the distinctions between Gehyra dubia and other Australian gecko species. These geckos also lack eyelids and have vertical eyes like most other gecko species. Therefore, they lick their eyes with their tongues rather than blinking in order to clean them. A nocturnal advantage is that their big eyes are about 350 times more sensitive than human eyes in the dark. When in periods of stress such as a predator chase, the dubious dtella can lose its tail as a mechanism for feigning injury.

== Range ==
In the 1800s, G. dubia were abundant in southeast Asia, Pacific Islands, and northern Australia. Now, G. dubia is widespread across Eastern Australia only. Since it is often confused with other geckos, many reports say they are present in island archipelagos north of Australia and in New Guinea. However, scholars limit its true range to just Australia.

== Ecology ==
=== Habitat ===
The dubious dtella is very adaptable and can live in a variety of habitats, including woodlands, dry forests, and shrublands. However, they are mainly arboreal and usually prefer a dry habitat. For that reason, G. dubia is not prevalent in rainforest areas. Its broad niche contributes to the prevalence of G. dubia in Queensland homes, as houses provide a hiding from predators and increased access to prey. For this reason, they are frequently found at night on walls, floors, or windowpanes. They also enjoy foraging dispersed prey at night time, which would explain their presence in the Australian bush.

=== Diet ===
Native house geckos are nocturnal, and therefore mostly feed and forage in the nighttime. Although G. dubia are habitat generalists, they are dietary specialists. The diet of G. dubia consists mainly of invertebrates. They have a preference for larger invertebrates such as scorpions, spiders, and beetles. When G. dubia stomachs were examined, all specimens were demonstrated to have been digesting cockroaches or spiders, as these invertebrates stay in the stomach longer before digestion. The abundance of night insects, such as ones crowding around light in human settlements, could explain the prevalence of G. dubia in the households. Their preference for dark, dry spaces explains their often being found in dimly lit corners of houses at night Furthermore G. dubia has been known to feed on plant nectar and sap as well. Sap is a fast and easily digestible source of sugar and nutrients, so these arboreal animals spend a lot of time licking the sap of the Acacia tree. Diet does not vary significantly between the sexes.

== Behavior ==
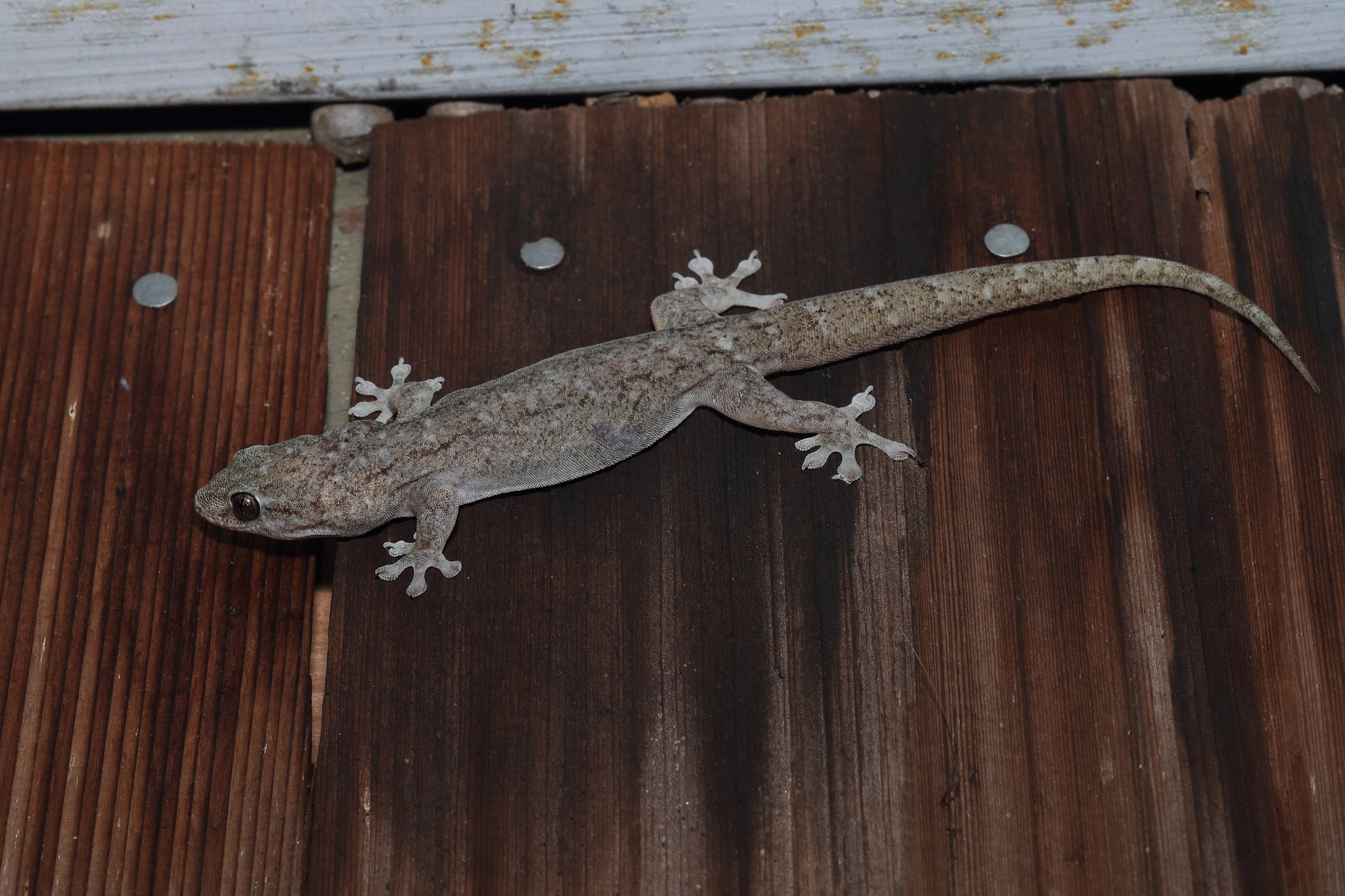
Dubious Dtella foraging in a house

=== Aggression and calling ===
When competition is high, G. dubia have been known to express aggressive behaviors due to their territoriality. In the presence of intruders, native geckos display aggressive behaviors such as biting, chasing, and clawing in order to protect their diurnal home space. This behavior is especially prominent in male dtella, regardless of the intruder species of gecko. G. dubia is also known to be more aggressive towards intruders when defending a home territory compared to competing species. Aggression of male G. dubia increases as intruder aggression increases. G. dubia is also unlikely to share a shelter with an intruder. During periods of aggression or distress, G dubia tends to make loud chirping calls. Since these are sometimes out of the range of human hearing, they might sound quiet or cryptic. These geckos actually modify their calls and chirps depending on circumstance, making such calls a crucial method of communication. They use different calls for aggressive encounters and sexual encounters, and modify depending on the sex and the size of the individual they are calling to.

=== Thermoregulation ===
Australian house geckos also use thermoregulation techniques in order to keep warm at night. Thermoregulation techniques occur more often in the dry season due to the lower temperatures. They are often seen basking close to trees, which can harness heat during the cool nights. Thermal niches, which can help with thermoregulation, are rare and very desirable resources like food. Thermal niches include warm rocks, houses, and trees. With the onset of climate change, these lizards are shifting their activity times to avoid lethal exposures to high temperature during the day and stay warm at night.

=== Predators ===
Snakes commonly prey on house geckos. Local snakes such as the Death Adder, brown tree snake, Collette's snake, and spotted python frequently consume G. dubia, and in return, the geckos exhibit anti-predatory behavior. Dtellas exhibit threat sensitivity, and do not avoid predators based on smell alone. In order to reduce the cost of threat avoidance, they avoid predators only when necessary. Unlike the invasive Asian House Gecko, the native House Gecko relies heavily on its excellent eyesight to sense and avoid predators instead of primarily using its smell. When confronted, dtellas can take measures such as losing their tail at a certain fracture point, which will later grow back in replacement. However, the tails will always be a different color when re-grown. Birds also tend to eat geckos, especially when they are resting and basking in the mornings.

== Life cycle ==
=== Reproduction ===
G. dubia is oviparous, meaning they reproduce by laying eggs. A typical female clutch consists of two eggs. Egg size increases as maternal body size increases. Since G. dubia are prevalent in human houses, eggs are often laid in clutches of two in crevices where the geckos reside. G. dubia lays its eggs and breeds during the wet season. They make mating chirps during breeding season, especially to please a mate. Chirping calls are related to mate signaling and used by males to call for females.

== Threats ==
=== Competition with Asian house geckos ===
Asian House Geckos (Hemidactylus frenatus) are an invasive species that were accidentally introduced to the Northern Territory and Queensland in the 1960s. Since then, they have been extremely successful, as they are habitat generalists. There is significant overlap between the ecological niches of H. frenatus and native geckos such as G. dubia, resulting in direct competition between the species. Like G. dubia, H. frenatus thrives in human houses because of plentiful prey. H. frenatus is more resistant to light than G. dubia, giving the invasive species a competitive edge in houses, allowing them to access more prey than G. dubia. Many scientists therefore believe that H. frenatus has been displacing and outcompeting G. dubia in houses, and pushing them back to natural areas like wooded forests and rocky outcroppings. However, it appears that G. dubia is more successful in natural Australian habitats than H. frenatus, as the Asian House Geckos have not been too invasive in natural areas. Scientists are also concerned about the effect of the microbiome of H. frenatus on native house geckos. Parasites native to H. frenatus could potentially threaten G. dubia as they continue to encounter each other.

Additionally, G. dubia is known to be more aggressive than H. frenatus. While Asian House Geckos engage in a lot of defensive behaviors like running away or having tail displays, Dtellas bite and scratch competitors when threatened. Asian House Geckos also engaged in more anti-predatory behavior, most likely due to the fact that they are newer to the area. G. dubia evolutionary has had similar predators so is therefore more acclimated to predatory behaviors and defending from it. H. frenatus on the other hand has not been in Australia long enough to adapt. All of these factors contribute to H. frenatus struggling presence in the wild, but dominance of the urban environment.

=== Relationship with humans ===
Since they are commonly found in houses and urban environments, G. dubia is frequently encountered by the Australian public. Their widespread ranges and prevalence in houses results in them being labelled as a house pest. They are often heard scuttling around houses at night, and can knock over appliances and even accidentally ruin electrical cables. For this reason, they are commonly killed every year as they can be seen as a nuisance. However, they do check insect and spider populations, which is a characteristic that goes unnoticed.

Their similarities to H. frenatus causes many to confuse the two. This may lead to the belief that G. dubia is also an invasive species that needs to be eliminated when in reality they are indigenous to Northeastern Australia.

=== Conservation status ===
G. dubia is listed as Least Concern by the IUCN Red List. Their ability to thrive in an urban environment has led to constant population size for the species.
