= Gehyra pulingka =

Conservation status
- Least Concern (IUCN 3.1)

Scientific classification
- Kingdom: Animalia
- Phylum: Chordata
- Class: Reptilia
- Order: Squamata
- Suborder: Gekkota
- Family: Gekkonidae
- Genus: Gehyra
- Species: G. pulingka

Binomial name
- Gehyra pulingka Hutchinson, Sistrom, Donnellan, & Hutchinson, 2014

Species of lizard

Gehyra pulingka (occasionally referred to as the rock-dwelling dtella, and more rarely the Umuwa spotted dtella) is a species of gecko endemic to Australia. It occurs in north-west South Australia, the mid Northern Territory, and Western Australia to the eastern Rawlinson Ranges. It is described as being generally dark-skinned with a pattern of light and dark markings over its body; however, light-skinned variants with similar patterns have been found.

== Etymology ==
The species name comes from the Pitjantjatjara language, from the words puli, meaning 'rock' or 'rocky hill', and the suffix of ngka, meaning 'of', or 'pertaining to'.
