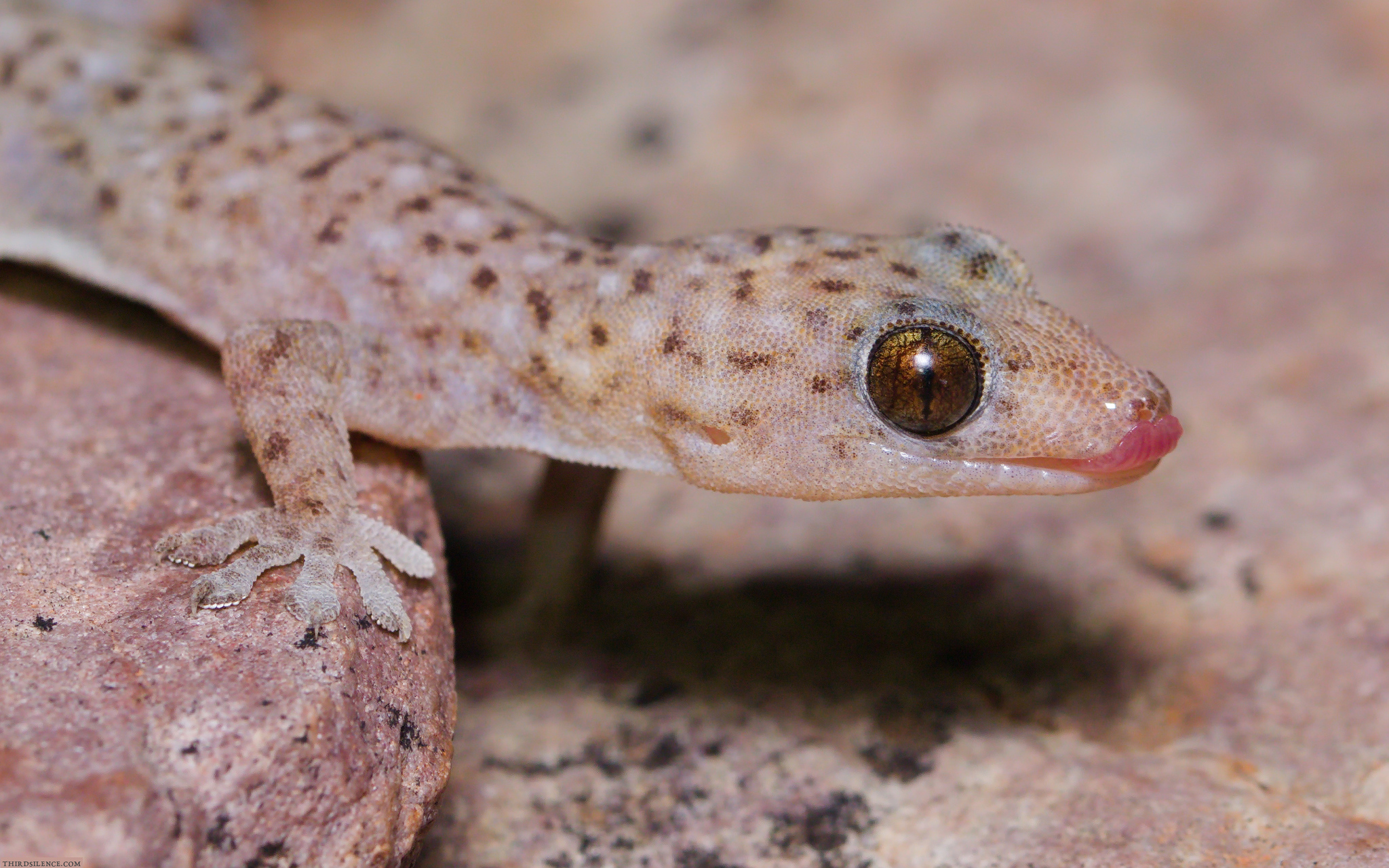

Scientific classification
- Kingdom: Animalia
- Phylum: Chordata
- Class: Reptilia
- Order: Squamata
- Suborder: Gekkota
- Family: Gekkonidae
- Genus: Gehyra
- Species: G. moritzi

Binomial name
- Gehyra moritzi Hutchinson, Sistrom, Donnellan & Hutchinson, 2014

= Gehyra moritzi =

Species of lizard

Gehyra moritzi is a species of gecko endemic to the Northern Territory of Australia.
