= Gehyra variegata =

Conservation status
- Least Concern (IUCN 3.1)

Scientific classification
- Kingdom: Animalia
- Phylum: Chordata
- Class: Reptilia
- Order: Squamata
- Suborder: Gekkota
- Family: Gekkonidae
- Genus: Gehyra
- Species: G. variegata

Binomial name
- Gehyra variegata (Duméril & Bibron, 1836)

Synonyms
- Hemidactylus variegatus; Hemidactylus pusillus; Peropus variegatus; Peropus pusillus; Peripia variegata; Lepidodactylus pusillus; Dactyloperus variegata; Dactyloperus variegatus; Dactyloperus lazelli

Species of lizard

Gehyra variegata, the tree dtella, variegated dtella or varied dtella, is a species of gecko in the genus Gehyra, native to inland Australia.

== Evolutionary history ==
The family Gekkonidae to which G. variegata belongs to are of Gondwanan origin. When the land mass of Australia split from Gondwana, it contained early agamids and diplodactlyds, the latter encompassing geckoes. During the evolutionary history of lizards the family Gekkonidae and Gekkoninae subfamily developed in the Scleroglossa group, which use their jaws rather than tongues when eating. The Scleroglossan group includes the clade Gekkota consisting of three families, including Gekkonidae.

== Description ==
The tree dtella's body (snout-vent) reaches a length of 55mm and a tail length of 70mm. The tree dtella has a highly variable dorsal colour which can likely be attributed to there being more than one species under the current name. Colours range from population to population from grey to brown with chequered dark and pale blotches and marbling in the eastern populations with western populations being marked with white to pale brown spots with dark bars. These patterns form an irregular reticulate pattern over the entire dorsal surface.

== Taxonomy ==
The scales on the body of the tree dtella are small and uniform, with the inter-orbital scales on its head are much smaller than the loreal scales. The rostral scale on its nose has steeply sloping upper edges.

There are several dark lines on the sides of the head of the tree dtella, with a whitish underside of the body. It has a long tail which tapers to a point and is generally 55% of the snout-vent length.

The fingers and toes of the tree dtella are clawed with large pads at the tips, enabling it to climb. All inner digits are claw-free, a trait of the genus Gehyra. The fingers and toes have divided subdigital lamellae and the third and fourth toes do not feature webbing.

== Habitat ==
The tree dtella lives in arid to sub-humid areas, including woodland, shrubland and rocky environments where dry conditions are common. It is both arboreal and saxicolous, found under loose bark and hollows on trees, and in crevices and under exfoliating rock. In trees, the tree dtella prefers sheltered sites greater than 1 metre from the ground and can also be found under ground debris.

== Distribution ==
Inland Australia, except in the north-west and south-east. Field studies have shown that the tree dtella exhibits metapopulation structure within its geographical region.

== Ecology ==
The tree dtella has the ability to survive in small patches of disturbed land, due to its ability to alter its habitat use in response to changes in the environment. Examples of this are seen in population in nature reserves populating shrubs, while populations in small fragmented remnant vegetation sheltering in logs and eucalyptus trees.

The tree dtella is an ectotherm, falling into the subgroup of thigmotherms that depend on heat exchange with the substrate for maintenance of body temperature. The arboreal dwelling tree dtella exhibits this trait by changing its location under the bark of trees as the sun warms different parts of the tree throughout the day. This behavioural thermoregulation is believed to be related to high thermal requirements for digestion.

== Diet ==
The diet of the tree dtella consists of beetles, termites, grasshoppers, cockroaches and spiders. The tree dtella forages in the first 3 hours after dark and tends to stay within 10 metres of its home.

== Lifespan and reproduction ==
The tree dtella has a lifespan of at least 5 years reaching maturity at the age of 3. It is oviparous with one hard shelled egg being laid beneath cover, usually bark, logs and holes under rocks twice in a breeding season usually 1 month apart. These eggs measure 10 by 11 mm with the first egg laid during late November. The gestation period for the eggs is approximately slightly longer than 2 months with hatching occurring after 61–79 days. ). Hatchlings are 45mm in total length. Nests are often communal, with 35 eggs in one nest having been found.

== Behaviour ==
Although a nocturnal animal, in the cooler months it basks in the sun and is also active under cover during the day. Males are territorial with several females and one male often sharing a site. The tree dtella also lives in human dwellings and can be seen around street lights at night hunting insects. The tree dtella can also emit a shrill squeak.
