= Craig Moritz =

Australian evolutionary biologist

- Education: University of Melbourne; Australian National University
- Known for: Research on evolutionary biogeography, molecular ecology and Australian reptiles
- Awards: Australian Research Council Laureate Fellowship (2012)
- Scientific career
- Fields: Evolutionary biology, biogeography, conservation biology
- Workplaces: University of Michigan; University of Queensland; University of California, Berkeley; Australian National University

Craig Moritz is an Australian biologist and evolutionary biologist known for his research in evolutionary biology, biogeography and conservation.

== Career ==
During his doctoral studies at the Australian National University (1980–1985), Moritz demonstrated the existence of parthenogenesis in the gecko Heteronotia binoei. He subsequently undertook postdoctoral research at the University of Michigan from 1985 to 1988 and at the University of Queensland from 1988 to 2000. From 2000 to 2012, he was director of the Museum of Vertebrate Zoology and a professor at the University of California, Berkeley. In 2012, he became a professor in the Division of Evolution, Ecology and Genetics at the Australian National University.

== Research ==
Moritz's research spans evolutionary biology, molecular ecology, biogeography, conservation biology, speciation, parthenogenesis in lizards and phylogeography. He has contributed to the description and classification of several animal taxa, particularly Australian geckos, as well as amphibians.

Taxa associated with his taxonomic work include:

- Amazophrynella
- Saltuarius
- Phyllurus isis
- Phyllurus nepthys
- Phyllurus ossa
- Orraya occultus

== Awards and honours ==
In 2012, Moritz became an Australian Research Council Laureate Fellow. He has also been associated with the California Academy of Sciences.

The gecko species Saltuarius moritzi, described in 2008, was named in his honour in recognition of his contributions to the phylogenetics of Australian rainforest reptiles. The gecko Gehyra moritzi was also named in his honour.
