= TMEM42 =

Identifiers
- Aliases: TMEM42, transmembrane protein 42
- External IDs: MGI: 1277176; HomoloGene: 11917; GeneCards: TMEM42; OMA:TMEM42 - orthologs

Gene location (Human)
Chr.	Chromosome 3 (human)
Band	3p21.31	Start	44,861,904 bp
Band	3p21.31	End	44,865,670 bp

Gene location (Mouse)
Chr.	Chromosome 9 (mouse)
Band	9 F4|9 73.52 cM	Start	122,850,391 bp
Band	9 F4|9 73.52 cM	End	122,852,770 bp
RNA expression pattern
Bgee	Human / Mouse (ortholog); Top expressed in: C1 segment; hypothalamus; substantia nigra; nucleus accumbens; hippocampus proper; amygdala; putamen; pituitary gland; caudate nucleus; anterior pituitary / Top expressed in: interventricular septum; epithelium of lens; right kidney; prostate; islet of Langerhans; pituitary gland; granulocyte; facial motor nucleus; neural layer of retina; proximal tubule; More reference expression data
BioGPS	n/a
Orthologs
Species	Human	Mouse
Entrez	131616	66079
Ensembl	ENSG00000169964; ENSG00000280516	ENSMUSG00000066233
UniProt	Q69YG0	Q9CR22
RefSeq (mRNA)	NM_144638	NM_001164823; NM_025339
RefSeq (protein)	NP_653239	NP_001158295; NP_079615
Location (UCSC)	Chr 3: 44.86 – 44.87 Mb	Chr 9: 122.85 – 122.85 Mb
PubMed search
- Wikidata
View/Edit Human	View/Edit Mouse

Transmembrane protein 42 (TMEM42) is a protein which in humans is encoded by the TMEM42 gene. TMEM42 and its associated proteins may play a role in development and maintenance of the retina.

== Gene ==
The TMEM42 gene is located on the plus strand of the short arm on human chromosome 3 at cytogenetic band 3p21.31. The gene spans 3,752 base pairs. The gene contains 3 exons.

=== Regulation ===
TMEM42 has a ubiquitous variable expression, with approximately a 5x range. It is expressed across all human tissues.

== mRNA ==
TMEM42 only has one transcript variant. This transcript is 977 nucleotides long. The transcript has a short 5' UTR. It has one predicted polyadenylation signal and site location.

== Protein ==
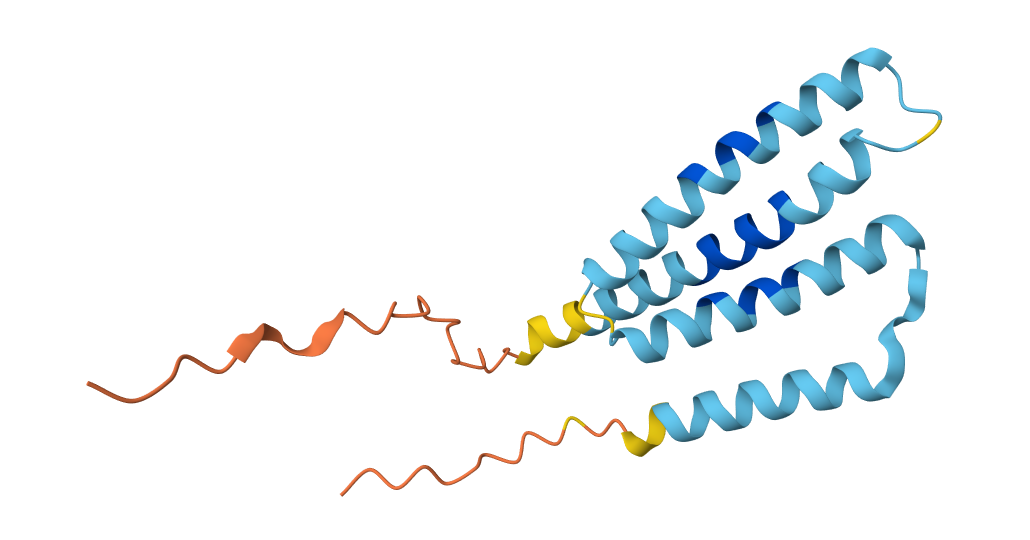
Homo sapiens TMEM42 predicted 3D structure

There is only one TMEM42 isoform. The TMEM42 protein is 159 amino acids long and has 4 transmembrane regions.

It has a molecular weight of about 17 kDa and an isoelectric point of about 9 pI. Based on its highest scoring predicted structure, the TMEM42 protein has four alpha helices. Topological predictions point to the majority of the protein being on the inside of the cell, with only 7 amino acids being on the extracellular side.

TMEM42 has two standard deviations lower amounts of aspartate compared to the average human protein.

=== Regulation ===
Experimental evidence points TMEM42 subcellular localization to the nucleoplasm, whereas computational predictions point to the endoplasmic reticulum and Golgi apparatus. Due to TMEM42 being largely intercellular, it has 26 predicted phosphorylation sites.

== Homology and evolution ==
=== Paralogs ===
There are no known human paralogs of this gene. There is an animal paralog, TMEM42a, estimated to appear 429 million years ago in zebrafish.

=== Orthologs ===
As seen in the table below, TMEM42 first appeared in fungi 1.27 billion years ago. This following table represents small selection of TMEM42 orthologs, identified via NCBI BLAST. Across 20 orthologs in the table below, seven amino acids are conserved across all 20 organisms.

Genus and species	Common name	Taxonomic group	Median date of divergence from humans (mya)	Accession number	Sequence length (aa)	Sequence identity (%) to human protein	Sequence similarity (%) to human protein
Homo sapiens	Human	Primates	0	NP_653239.1	159	100	100
Pan troglodytes	Chimpanzee	Primates	6	NP_001229549.3	159	99.4	99.4
Manis pentadactyla	Chinese pangolin	Pholidota	94	XP_036739795.2	159	81.1	84.3
Euleptes europaea	Tarantolino	Squamata	319	XP_056713860.1	147	33.9	45.7
Heteronotia binoei	Prickly gecko	Squamata	319	XP_060104087.1	147	32.3	42.5
Carettochelys insculpta	Pitted-shelled turtle	Testudines	319	XP_074842191.1	149	32.1	43.7
Calidris pugnax	Ruff	Charadriiformes	319	XP_014813517.1	152	34.3	47.4
Dromaius novaehollandiae	Emu	Casuariiformes	319	XP_064362502.1	135	31.0	43.7
Manacus vitellinus	Golden-collared manakin	Passeriformes	319	XP_029817613.1	175	26.2	35.7
Rhinatrema bivittatum	Two-lined caecilian	Gymnophiona	352	XP_029445552.1	178	33.2	51.1
Spea bombifrons	Plains spadefoot toad	Anura	352	XP_053324228.1	144	31.3	44.5
Pleurodeles waltl	Iberian ribbed newt	Urodela	352	XP_069067612.1	158	31.9	44.5
Lates calcarifer	Barramundi perch	Carangiformes	429	XP_018536264.1	150	29.8	42.0
Coregonus clupeaformis	Lake whitefish	Salmoniformes	429	XP_041707945.1	127	29.4	41.2
Electrophorus electricus	Electric eel	Gymnotiformes	429	XP_026886815.1	155	27.7	40.0
Zootermopsis nevadensis	Nevada termite	Blattodea	686	XP_021923555.1	125	29.8	41.7
Anabrus simplex	Mormon cricket	Orthoptera	686	XP_067001956.2	129	25.0	38.1
Aedes albopictus	Asian tiger mosquito	Diptera	686	XP_029713444.1	135	21.1	36.7
Coemansia javaensis	N/A	Zoopagomycotan	1275	KAJ2786225.1	127	28.2	37.1
Coemansia spiralis	N/A	Zoopagomycotan	1275	KAJ2708432.1	153	22.0	32.4

== Interacting proteins ==
Notable protein interactions of human TMEM42
Protein Name	Extended Name	Description
TLCD5	TLC Domain Containing 5	Role in human retina and lipid metabolism
CCDC24	Coiled-Coil Domain Containing 24	Retinal development
WFDC5	WAP Four-Disulfide Core Domain 5	Protease inhibitor
UBE2I	SUMO-conjugating enzyme UBC9	Performs conjugation step of sumoylation process
KIF15	Kinesin family member 15	Maintains spindle apparatus during mitosis

== Clinical significance ==
TMEM42 contains two cis-eQTLs, one on the promoter sequence and one on the 5' UTR. TMEM42 has been implicated as a protective factor against papillary renal cell carcinoma.

RNA-binding protein MBNL1 has 8 predicted binding sites on the TMEM42 transcript. Impairments in MBNL1 function are associated with myotonic dystrophy. Vastus lateralis biopises showed significantly reduced TMEM42 abundance in those with myotonic dystrophy type 2.
