= Parthenogenesis in squamates =

Asexual reproduction by snakes and lizards

Parthenogenesis is a mode of asexual reproduction in which offspring are produced by females without the genetic contribution of a male. Among all the sexual vertebrates, the only examples of true parthenogenesis, in which all-female populations reproduce without the involvement of males, are found in squamate reptiles (snakes and lizards). There are about 50 species of lizard and 1 species of snake that reproduce solely through parthenogenesis (obligate parthenogenesis). It is unknown how many sexually reproducing species are also capable of parthenogenesis in the absence of males (facultative parthenogenesis), but recent research has revealed that this ability is widespread among squamates.

== Mechanisms ==
Parthenogenesis can result from either full cloning of the mother's genome, or through the combination of haploid genomes to create a "half-clone". Both mechanisms of parthenogenesis are seen in reptiles.

=== Full-cloning ===
Females can produce full clones of themselves through a modification of the normal meiosis process used to produce haploid egg cells for sexual reproduction. The female's germ cells undergo a process of premeiotic genome doubling, or endoreduplication, so that two consecutive division cycles in the process of meiosis result in a diploid, rather than haploid, genome. Whereas homologous chromosomes pair and separate during meiosis I in sexual species, identical duplicate sister chromosomes, produced through premeiotic replication, pair and separate during meiosis I in true parthenotes. Pairing of identical sister chromosomes, in comparison to the alternative of pairing homologous chromosomes, maintains heterozygosity in obligate parthenotes. Meiosis II involves the separation of sister chromatids in both sexual and parthenogenetic species. This method of parthenogenesis is observed in obligate parthenotes, such as lizards in the genus Aspidoscelis and Darevskia, and also in certain facultative parthenotes like the Burmese python.

=== Half-cloning ===
Another mechanism typically observed in facultative parthenote reptiles is terminal fusion, in which a haploid polar body produced as a byproduct of normal female meiosis fuses with the egg cell to form a diploid nucleus, much as a haploid sperm cell fuses its nucleus with that of an egg cell to form a diploid genome during sexual reproduction. This method of parthenogenesis produces offspring that are homozygous at nearly all genetic loci, and inherit approximately half of their mother's genetic diversity. This form of parthenogenesis can produce male as well as WW-genotype females. Because the meiosis process proceeds normally in species employing this mechanism, they are capable of both sexual and asexual reproduction, as in the Komodo dragon and several species of snakes.

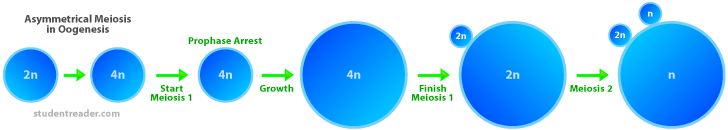
The process of meiosis in sexually reproducing females leads to the production of an egg cell as well as a haploid polar body, which can fuse nuclei with the egg cell to allow facultative parthenogenesis

== Types of parthenogenesis ==
=== True parthenogenesis ===
"True" parthenogenesis is a form of asexual reproduction in all-female species that produce offspring without any male involvement.

==== Lizards ====
There are at least eight parthenogenetic species of Caucasian rock lizard in the genus Darevskia. This genus is unique in containing the only known monoclonal parthenogenetic species, Darevskia rostombekovi, where the entire species originates from a single hybridization event. In all other cases of unisexual reptilian species that have been examined, multiple separate asexual lineages are present. As true parthenotes, Darevskia do not require stimulation from sperm to reproduce.

The best-known and perhaps most evolutionarily derived example of parthenogenesis in reptiles occurs within the Teiid genus of whiptail lizards known as Aspidoscelis. This genus contains at least 13 truly parthenogenetic species, which originate from hybridization events between sexual Aspidoscelis species. Parthenogenetic whiptails are unusual in that they engage in female-female courtship to induce ovulation, with one non-ovulating female engaging in courting behavior normally seen in males while the ovulating female assumes the typical female role. While sex hormone levels in parthenogenetic Aspidoscelis uniparens mimic the cycles seen in their sexual relatives, their nervous systems appear to have evolved unique responses to female sex hormones. Male-like behavior in A. uniparens is correlated with high progesterone levels. This female-female pseudocopulation has also been found to enhance fecundity. A triploid parthenogenetic species in the genus Aspidoscelis, formerly part of Cnemidophorus, has been fertilized with sperm from a sexual species in the same genus to produce a new tetraploid parthenogenetic species in laboratory experiments. Such experiments provide evidence that even truly parthenogenetic species are still capable of incorporating new genetic material.

There are six parthenogenetic gecko species in five genera: Hemidactylus garnotii (Indo-Pacific house gecko), Hemidactylus vietnamensis (Vietnamese house gecko), Hemiphyllodactylus typus (dwarf tree gecko), Heteronotia binoei (Binoe's gecko), Nactus pelagicus (pelagic gecko), and Lepidodactylus lugubris (mourning gecko). The often quoted parthenogeneetic species N. arnouxi is nomen rejectum (ICZN 1991) and therefore a synonym of N. pelagicus, while Gehyra ogasawarisimae is a misidentified L. lugubris. The gecko Lepidodactylus lugubris is a parthenogenetic species also known to engage in female-female copulation. The species consists of a number of clonal genetic lineages thought to arise from different hybridization events. Surprisingly, parthenogenetic females of this species occasionally produce male offspring, which are thought to be the result of non-genetic hormonal inversions. While these males are anatomically normal, they produce abnormal sperm and are sterile.

The fecundity of both parthenogenetic and sexual races of the gekkonid lizard Heteronotia binoei were compared. These races occur together in areas of the Australian arid zone. Under laboratory conditions, the parthenogenetic geckos had about a 30% lower fecundity than their sexual progenitors.

Parthenotes are also found in two species of the night lizard genus Lepidophyma. Unlike most parthenogenetic reptiles, Lepidophyma lizards show very low genetic heterozygosity, suggesting a non-hybrid origin.

==== Snakes ====
The brahminy blindsnake is a triploid obligate parthenote and the only snake species known to be obligately parthenogenetic.

=== Facultative parthenogenesis ===
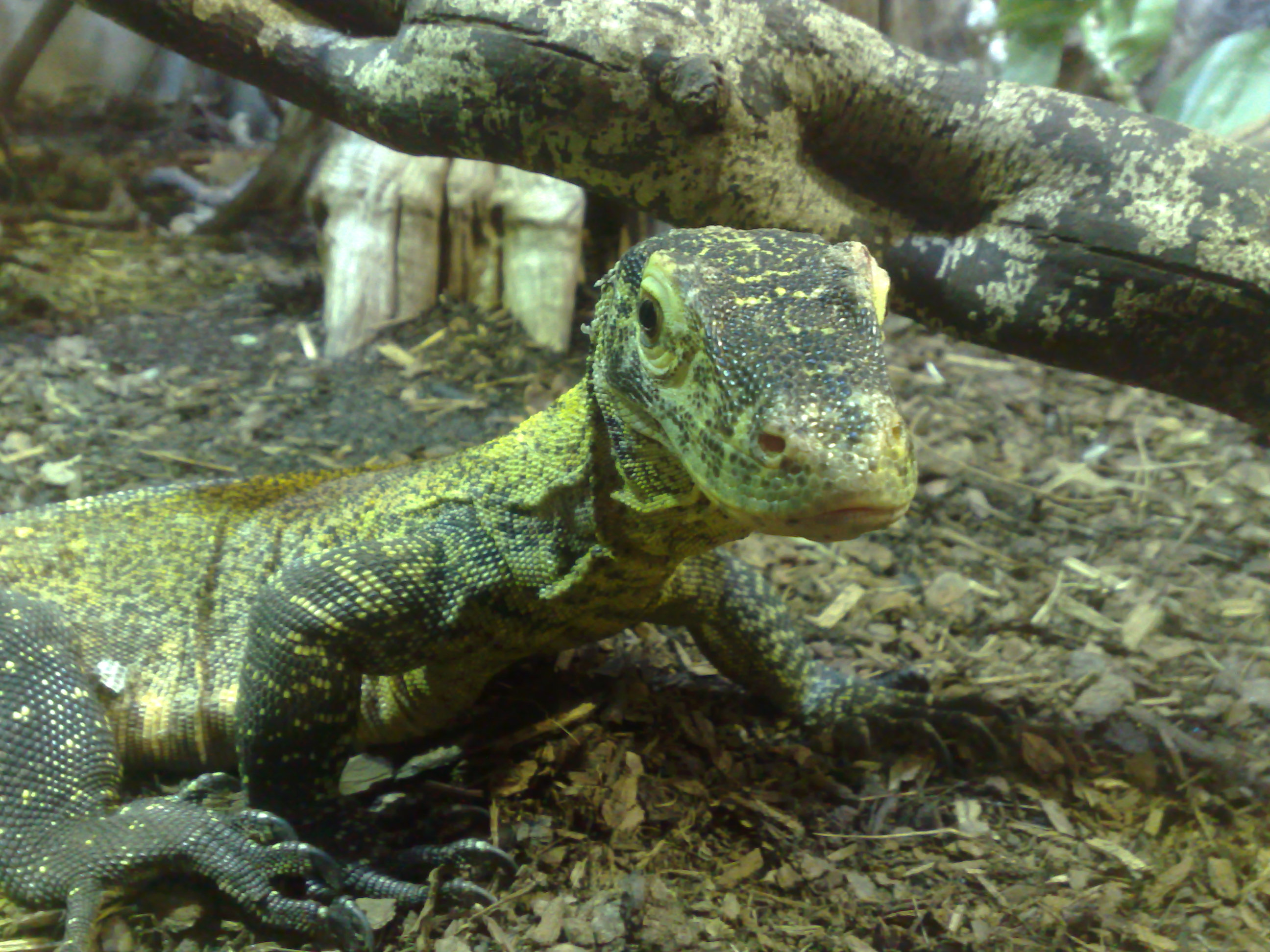
A juvenile male komodo dragon, Varanus komodoensis, at the Chester Zoo. Females of the species can occasionally reproduce through parthenogenesis

Facultative parthenogenesis is the type of parthenogenesis when a female individual can reproduce via both sexual and asexual reproduction. Females can produce viable offspring with or without genetic contribution from a male, and such an ability may, just like true parthenogens, enable colonization of new habitats by single female animals. Facultative parthenogenesis is extremely rare in nature, with only a few examples of animal taxa capable of facultative parthenogenesis, of which none are vertebrate taxa.

Facultative parthenogenesis is often incorrectly used to describe cases of accidental or spontaneous parthenogenesis in normally sexual animals, including many examples in squamata. For example, many cases of accidental parthenogenesis in sharks, some snakes, Komodo dragons and a variety of domesticated birds were widely perpetuated as facultative parthenogenesis. These cases should, however, be considered accidental parthenogenesis, given the frequency of asexually produced eggs and their hatching rates are extremely low, in contrast to true facultative parthenogenesis where the majority of asexually produced eggs hatch. In addition, asexually produced offspring in vertebrates exhibit extremely high levels of sterility, highlighting that this mode of reproduction is not adaptive. The occurrence of such asexually produced eggs in sexual animals can be explained by a meiotic error, leading to automictically produced eggs.

=== Facultative parthenogenesis in snakes ===
King cobra snakes have been demonstrated to be capable of facultative parthenogenesis. The mechanism of parthenogenesis is a modification of meiosis called terminal fusion automixis, a process that involves the fusion of the meiotic products formed at the anaphase II stage of meiosis.

Three species of the Neotropical pit viper Bothrops atrox group have been show to be capable of facultative parthenogenesis based on information concerning their captivity and also by testing using molecular markers (heterologous microsatellites). In these cases non-viable ova, infertile eggs and deformed offspring were common.

In a pet ball python, parthenogenetic reproduction was shown to occur. When a mother and her early-stage embryos were compared genetically, the embryos were found to be of parthenogenetic origin.

When in captivity, the Burmese python was shown to be able to reproduce asexually. The offspring were found to be clones of their mother and reproduction was apparently by a parthenogenetic mechanism involving a variation of the meiotic process.

=== Facultative parthenogenesis in lizards ===
The Arizona striped whiptail lizard Aspidoscelis arizonae can produce haploid unfertilized oocytes that undergo facultative parthenogenesis by a post-meiotic mechanism that results in genome wide homozygosity. In species that are able to undergo facultative parthenogenesis, the transition to the completely homozygous condition can lead to exposure of their genetic load resulting in an elevated rate of congenital malformations and embryonic mortality. Despite this risk, A. arizonae can produce a small percentage of unfertilized oocytes that are capable of parthenogenesis and develop normally. Thus, A. arizonae is an example of facultative parthenogenesis that can potentially allow purifying selection to occur with the consequence that all lethal recessive alleles are purged in only one generation.

=== Gynogenesis ===
Gynogenesis is a form of asexual reproduction in which female eggs are activated by male sperm, but no male genetic material is contributed to offspring. While this mode of reproduction has not been observed in reptiles, it occurs in several salamander species of the genus Ambystoma.

=== Hybridogenesis ===
Hybridogenesis is a variation of parthenogenesis in which males mate with females, but only the mother's genetic material is propagated by these offspring to their own young. While this form of reproduction has not been observed in reptiles, it does occur in frogs of the genus Pelophylax.

== Evolution ==
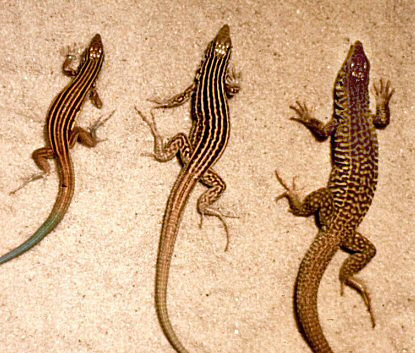
Aspidoscelis neomexicanus is unusual in being a diploid parthenote, produced as a result of hybridization between A. inornatus (left) and A. tigris (right)

=== Origin ===
In all parthenogenetic reptile species studied to date, chromosomal evidence supports the theory that parthenogenesis arose through a hybridization event, although members of the genus Lepidophyma may be exceptions to this rule. The original hybridization event is believed to occur between two related species and is often followed by backcrossing to either parent species to create triploid parthenogenetic offspring. As no crosses of two sexual species in captivity have ever produced parthenogenetic offspring, it is unclear how a hybridization event would actually lead to asexual reproduction. It is possible that parthenogenesis evolved as a way of overcoming sterility due to improper chromosomal pairing and segregation during meiosis in hybrids, and that rare hybrid individuals that could premeiotically duplicate their chromosomes could escape hybrid sterility by reproducing through parthenogenesis. The ability to premeiotically duplicate chromosomes would be selected for in this scenario as it would be the only option for successful reproduction.

=== Selective advantage ===
While it is often assumed that parthenogenesis is an inferior evolutionary strategy to sexual reproduction because parthenogenetic species lack the ability to complement genetic mutations through outcrossing or are unable to incorporate new genetic material, research on parthenogenetic species has gradually revealed a number of advantages to this mode of reproduction. Triploid unisexual geckos of the species Heteronotia binoei have greater endurance and aerobic capacity than their diploid ancestors, and this advantage may be the result of polyploidy and a form of hybrid vigor. It has also been observed that obligate parthenotes are often found at high altitudes and in sparse or marginal habitats, a pattern known as "geographical parthenogenesis," and their distribution in suboptimal territories may be a result of their increased colonization ability. A single parthenogenetic individual can colonize a new territory and produce offspring, while for a sexual species multiple individuals would need to occupy a new habitat and come into contact with each other for mating in order for successful colonization to occur. A parthenogenetic species can undergo a more rapid population increase than a sexual species because all parthenotes are female and produce offspring, while in sexual species half of all individuals are males and do not give birth to offspring. Additionally, laboratory experiments have revealed that even obligate parthenotes retain the capability of incorporating new genetic material through sexual reproduction to form new parthenogenetic lineages, and the ability to outcross on occasion may explain the lengthy evolutionary persistence of some parthenogenetic species.
