= Crenadactylus horni =

Conservation status
- Least Concern (IUCN 3.1)

Scientific classification
- Kingdom: Animalia
- Phylum: Chordata
- Class: Reptilia
- Order: Squamata
- Suborder: Gekkota
- Family: Diplodactylidae
- Genus: Crenadactylus
- Species: C. horni

Binomial name
- Crenadactylus horni (Lucas & Frost, 1895)

Species of gecko

Crenadactylus horni, the Central Uplands clawless gecko, is a species of gecko endemic to the central desert region of Australia.

== Taxonomy ==
A species proposed by Arthur H. S. Lucas and Charles Frost, given the name Ebenavia horni to ally the taxon to a clawless gecko species found in Madagascar, basing their description on material collected on the Horn expedition to central Australia. The taxon was later placed as a subspecies of Crenadactylus ocellatus, but re-elevated to species status in a revision of the genus that recognised seven distinguishable species. The type locality was identified as Charlotte Waters in the Northern Territory.

The specific epithet horni is named by Lucas and Frost for the sponsor of the scientific expedition that provided the type specimen, the pastoralist William Austin Horn.

== Description ==
A species of Crenadactylus, distinguished by superficial details of the scales and coloration. The snout vent length is recorded up to 34.8 mm, a larger and robust species of the relatively smaller genus of geckos. The stripes running the length of the body contrasts a darker colour against the mostly tan and pale brown of the scales.

Records of the habitat at the collection sites indicate an association with spinifex mounds, a dominant vegetation type of the arid centre of Australia. Crenadactylus horni presumed to have become geographically isolated around twenty to thirty million years ago, shown in evidence of ancient genetic divergence, persisting in micro-habitat that has become separated from sister species by the increasingly dry climate of the continent.
