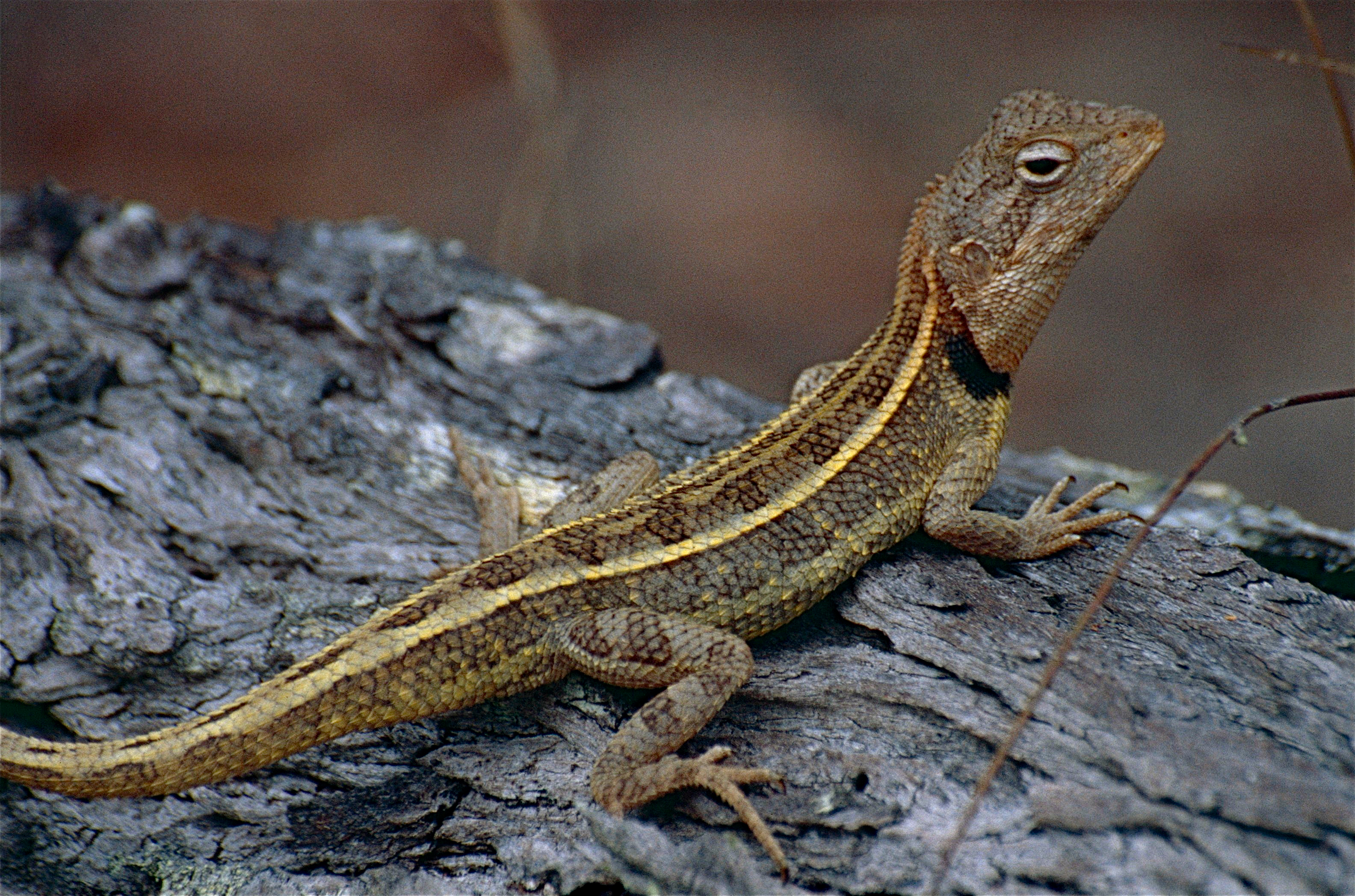

Conservation status
- Least Concern (IUCN 3.1)

Scientific classification
- Kingdom: Animalia
- Phylum: Chordata
- Class: Reptilia
- Order: Squamata
- Suborder: Iguania
- Family: Agamidae
- Genus: Diporiphora
- Species: D. bilineata

Binomial name
- Diporiphora bilineata JE Gray, 1842

= Diporiphora bilineata =

Species of lizard

Diporiphora bilineata, the northern two-line dragon or two-lined dragon, is a species of agama found in Australia and Papua New Guinea.
