= Diporiphora jugularis =

Scientific classification
- Domain: Eukaryota
- Kingdom: Animalia
- Phylum: Chordata
- Class: Reptilia
- Order: Squamata
- Suborder: Iguania
- Family: Agamidae
- Genus: Diporiphora
- Species: D. jugularis

Binomial name
- Diporiphora jugularis Macleay, 1877

Species of lizard

Diporiphora jugularis, the black-throated two-pored dragon, is a species of agama found in Australia and Papua New Guinea.
