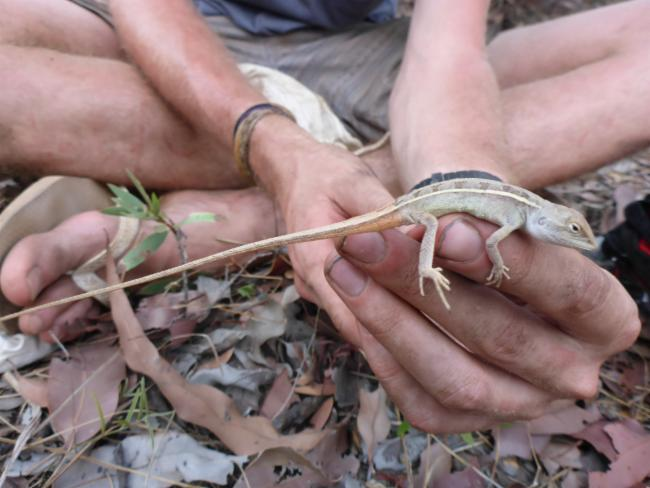

Conservation status
- Least Concern (IUCN 3.1)

Scientific classification
- Kingdom: Animalia
- Phylum: Chordata
- Class: Reptilia
- Order: Squamata
- Suborder: Iguania
- Family: Agamidae
- Genus: Diporiphora
- Species: D. lalliae

Binomial name
- Diporiphora lalliae Storr, 1974

= Diporiphora lalliae =

Species of lizard

Diporiphora lalliae, also known commonly as Lally's two-line dragon and the northern deserts dragon, is a species of lizard in the family Agamidae. The species is endemic to Australia.

== Etymology ==
The specific name, lalliae, is in honor of Mrs. G.E. "Lally" Handley of the Western Australian Museum.

== Description ==
D. lalliae may attain a snout-to-vent length (SVL) of 6.2 cm (2.4 in). The tail is very long, about three times SVL. There is a gular fold. The scales in the axilla are small, but not granular. There are four precloacal pores, but no femoral pores.

The postauricular folds and scapular folds are strong. The strongly keeled dorsal scales are homogeneous. There is one enlarged canine tooth on each side.

== Geographic range ==
D. lalliae native to northern Australia, where it is found in the Australian states of Queensland and Western Australia, and also in Northern Territory.

== Habitat ==
D. lalliae is found in a variety of habitats, including forest, shrubland, grassland, and rocky areas.

== Reproduction ==
D. lalliae is oviparous.
