= Diporiphora pallida =

Scientific classification
- Domain: Eukaryota
- Kingdom: Animalia
- Phylum: Chordata
- Class: Reptilia
- Order: Squamata
- Suborder: Iguania
- Family: Agamidae
- Genus: Diporiphora
- Species: D. pallida

Binomial name
- Diporiphora pallida Melville, Date, Horner, & Doughty, 2019

Species of lizard

Diporiphora pallida, the pale two-pored dragon, is a species of agama found in the Kimberley region of Western Australia.
