= Diporiphora paraconvergens =

Conservation status
- Least Concern (IUCN 3.1)

Scientific classification
- Kingdom: Animalia
- Phylum: Chordata
- Class: Reptilia
- Order: Squamata
- Suborder: Iguania
- Family: Agamidae
- Genus: Diporiphora
- Species: D. paraconvergens

Binomial name
- Diporiphora paraconvergens Doughty, Kealley, & Melville, 2012

Species of lizard

Diporiphora paraconvergens, the grey-striped western desert dragon, is a species of agama found in Australia.
