= Diporiphora sobria =

Scientific classification
- Domain: Eukaryota
- Kingdom: Animalia
- Phylum: Chordata
- Class: Reptilia
- Order: Squamata
- Suborder: Iguania
- Family: Agamidae
- Genus: Diporiphora
- Species: D. sobria

Binomial name
- Diporiphora sobria Storr, 1974

Species of lizard

Diporiphora sobria, the northern savannah two-pored dragon, is a species of agama found in Australia.
