= Harry Butler =

Australian naturalist (1930–2015)

Harry Butler AO CBE
- Born: William Henry Butler; 25 March 1930; Perth, Western Australia, Australia
- Died: 11 December 2015 (aged 85); Perth, Western Australia
- Education: Claremont Teachers College; Western State College
- Occupations: Environmental consultant television presenter
- Employer: ABC
- Known for: Environmentalism, songwriting
- Television: In the Wild – ABC Television

William Henry Butler AO CBE (25 March 1930 – 11 December 2015) was an Australian naturalist and environmental consultant, best known as the presenter of the popular ABC television series In the Wild from 1976 to 1981. He was a household name as he took viewers to remote parts of Australia observing and admiring the natural environment.

His advocacy led to the establishment of offshore islands as reserves for plants and animals, protected from invasive species. Now his legacy is being remembered with Murdoch University's Harry Butler Institute. The new research and education facility brings science, business and the community together to address environmental problems.

He spoke highly of how Indigenous people cared for the land, having extensive knowledge of indigenous culture and vast experience with various language groups throughout Western Australia.

== Biography ==
Butler was born on 25 March 1930 in Perth, Western Australia. He attended Claremont Teachers College in Western Australia and later the Western State College in the United States.

Butler co-wrote "Sun Arise" with fellow Western Australian Rolf Harris; the song reached the Top 10 in the UK in 1962.

Butler was a populariser of science and natural history for both child and adult audiences, especially through the ABC television series In the Wild, which led to him being named Australian of the Year in 1979. He also authored the books In The Wild, In the Wild (Part II) and Looking at the Wild.

As conservation consultant to projects including the development of an oil field and the Gorgon gas project on Barrow Island, Butler played a major role in environmental conservation and restoration in Australia. In 1968, he participated in the fifth of the Harold Hall Australian ornithological collecting expeditions. He lectured, and was honoured, at museums in Western Australia, Canada, and the United States. Butler was a supporter of development projects such as mining, working with corporations and state governments as an environmental consultant.

Butler lost some popularity with his support of the construction of the Franklin River Dam in the early 1980s.

He died of cancer, aged 85, at a hospital in Perth on 11 December 2015.

== Controversies ==
Butler received some backlash for not supporting Kakadu's listing as a national park "After he argued that Stage Two of the Kakadu National Park should not be included in the World Heritage list, saying the area was "biologically degraded", he was dropped from Australian Bicentennial Authority advertising." referring to the area as a "clapped-out Holden"

== Honours ==
In 1970, Butler was appointed a Member of the Order of the British Empire. In 1980 this was upgraded to Commander level (CBE).

In 1979, Butler was named the joint Australian of the Year, jointly with Neville Bonner.

In 1993, he was awarded a cash prize for his 30 years of work with the petroleum industry.

On 4 March 2012, he was added to the National Trust of Australia's National Living Treasures list.

On 11 June 2012, he was named an Officer of the Order of Australia for "distinguished service to the community through the promotion of public understanding of natural history and wildlife conservation, to the development of collaborative environmental partnerships with industry, and to the community".

On 17 April 2016, the new Western Australian Museum research facility and storage centre in Welshpool was named in his honour.

The Harry Butler Institute was established in August 2017 at Murdoch University, in honour of Harry's legacy. The sustainable research institute fosters a collaborative research environment that drives innovation for a sustainable future. A Harry Butler Science Centre is in development at Murdoch University.

=== Species named after Butler ===
A species of mulga snake, Pseudechis butleri, and a spider, Synothele butleri, are named after Butler. Three species of Australian lizards are named after Butler: Delma butleri, Morethia butleri, and Notoscincus butleri. Two species of Australian lizards are named after Butler and his wife Margaret: Ctenophorus butlerorum and Eremiascincus butlerorum. Two species of Australian reptiles are named after Margaret: a snake, Anilios margaretae; and a lizard, Diporiphora margaretae.

Awards
Preceded by Alan Bond and Galarrwuy Yunupingu	Australian of the Year Award; 1979; Served alongside: Senator Neville Bonner	Succeeded by Manning Clark
