= Ctenotus rhabdotus =

Scientific classification
- Domain: Eukaryota
- Kingdom: Animalia
- Phylum: Chordata
- Class: Reptilia
- Order: Squamata
- Family: Scincidae
- Genus: Ctenotus
- Species: C. rhabdotus

Binomial name
- Ctenotus rhabdotus Rabosky & Doughty, 2017

Species of lizard

Ctenotus rhabdotus, the Kimberley lined ctenotus, is a species of skink found in Northern Territory and Western Australia.
