= Diporiphora margaretae =

Scientific classification
- Kingdom: Animalia
- Phylum: Chordata
- Class: Reptilia
- Order: Squamata
- Suborder: Iguania
- Family: Agamidae
- Genus: Diporiphora
- Species: D. margaretae

Binomial name
- Diporiphora margaretae Storr, 1974

Synonyms
- Diporifora bilineata margaretae Storr, 1974

Species of reptile found in the Kimberley region of Western Australia

Diporiphora margaretae is a species of lizard in the subfamily Amphibolurinae of the family Agamidae. The species is native to the Kimberley region of Australia.

== Etymology ==
The specific name, margaretae, is in honour of Margaret Butler, the wife of Australian naturalist Harry Butler.

== Description ==
Diporifora margaretae may attain a snout-to-vent length (SVL) of 5.5 cm (2.2 in), with a tail length 2.5 times SVL. It does not have a gular fold. It has four precloacal pores, but no femoral pores.

It has one enlarged canine tooth on each side of the upper jaw. There are scattered white scales on the dark flanks. Breeding males have a reddish flush on the lower flanks and tail.

== Reproduction ==
Diporiphora margaretae is oviparous.
