= In the Wild =

In The Wild is a nature television series produced by the Australian Broadcasting Corporation from 1976 until 1981. It was hosted by Harry Butler, an Australian naturalist and environmental consultant.

The re-runs of In The Wild continued to play into the 1990s.

With a hand-on style, the show could be seen as a predecessor to the Steve Irwin/Crocodile Hunter style of nature television.
