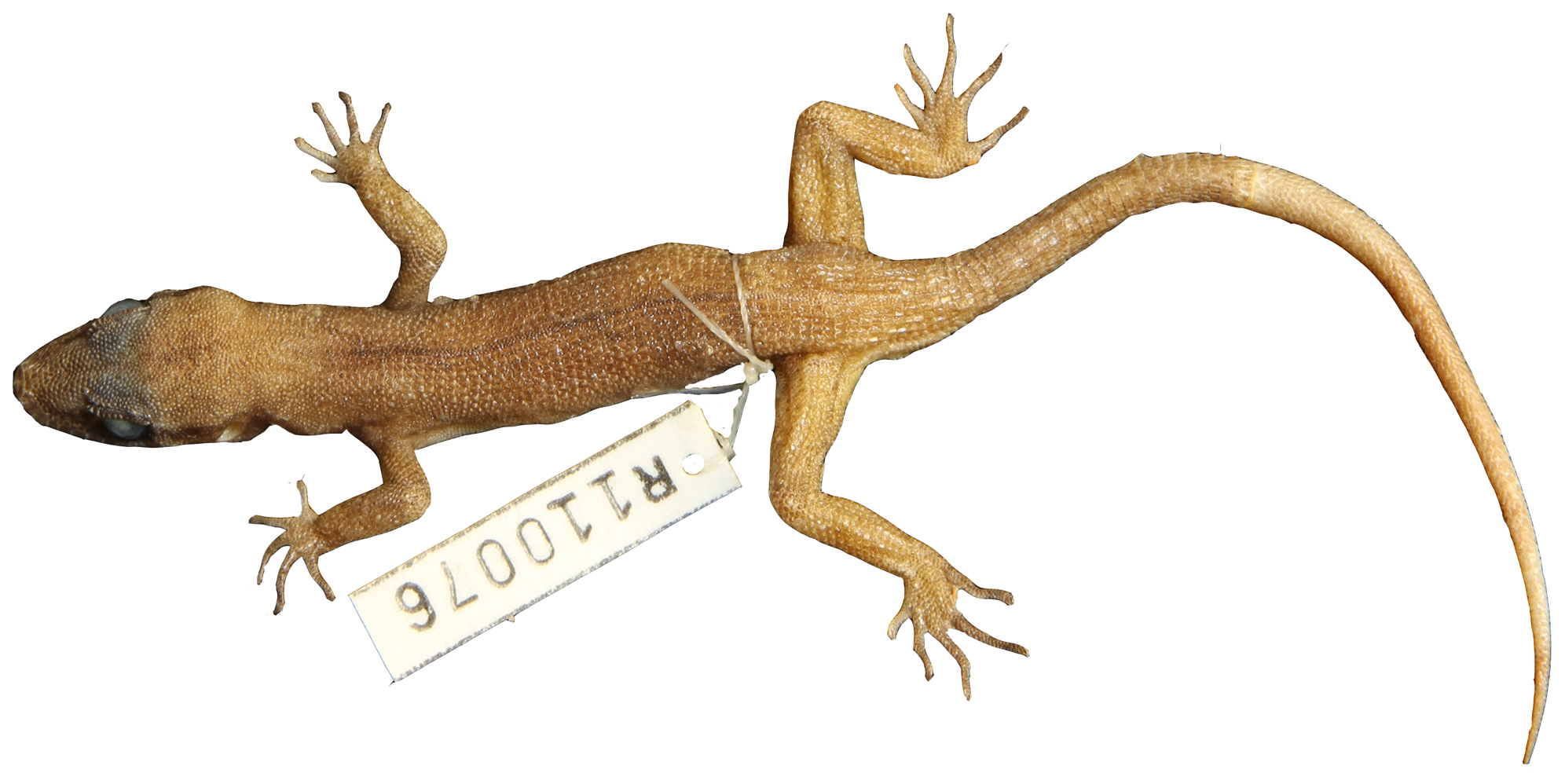

Conservation status
- Least Concern (IUCN 3.1)

Scientific classification
- Kingdom: Animalia
- Phylum: Chordata
- Class: Reptilia
- Order: Squamata
- Suborder: Gekkota
- Family: Gekkonidae
- Genus: Heteronotia
- Species: H. atra

Binomial name
- Heteronotia atra Pepper, Doughty, Fujita, Moritz, & Keogh, 2013

= Black Pilbara gecko =

Species of lizard

The black Pilbara gecko (Heteronotia atra) is a species of gecko. It is endemic to Australia.
