= Diporiphora vescus =

Conservation status
- Vulnerable (IUCN 3.1)

Scientific classification
- Kingdom: Animalia
- Phylum: Chordata
- Class: Reptilia
- Order: Squamata
- Suborder: Iguania
- Family: Agamidae
- Genus: Diporiphora
- Species: D. vescus

Binomial name
- Diporiphora vescus Doughty, Kealley, & Melville, 2012

Species of lizard

Diporiphora vescus, the northern Pilbara tree dragon, is a species of agama found in Australia.
