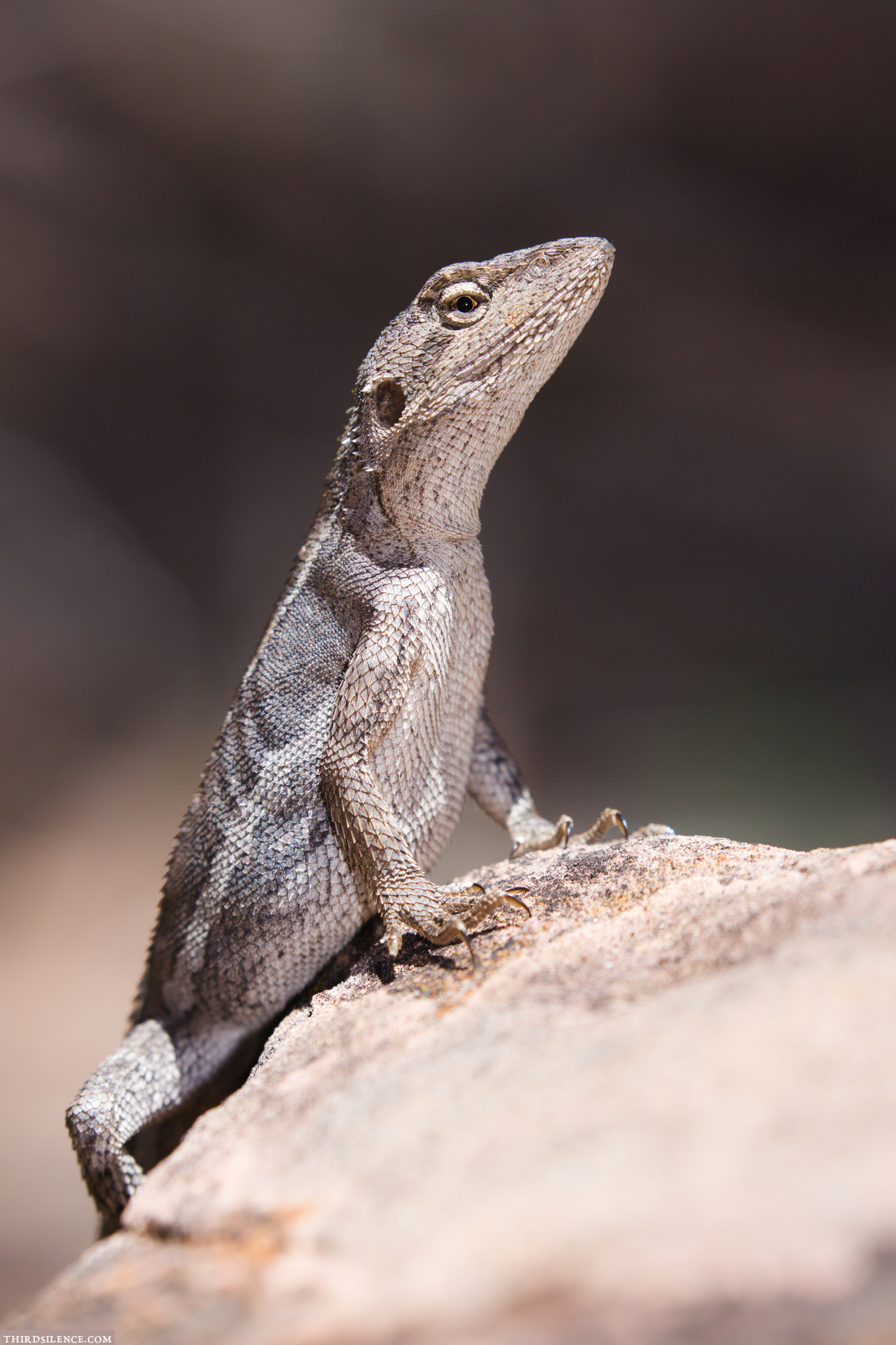

Conservation status
- Least Concern (IUCN 3.1)

Scientific classification
- Kingdom: Animalia
- Phylum: Chordata
- Class: Reptilia
- Order: Squamata
- Suborder: Iguania
- Family: Agamidae
- Genus: Diporiphora
- Species: D. nobbi

Binomial name
- Diporiphora nobbi (Witten, 1972)

Synonyms
- Amphibolurus nobbi nobbi Witten, 1972; Amphibolurus nobbi coggeri Witten, 1972; Diporiphora nobbi — Edwards & Melville, 2011

= Diporiphora nobbi =

Species of lizard

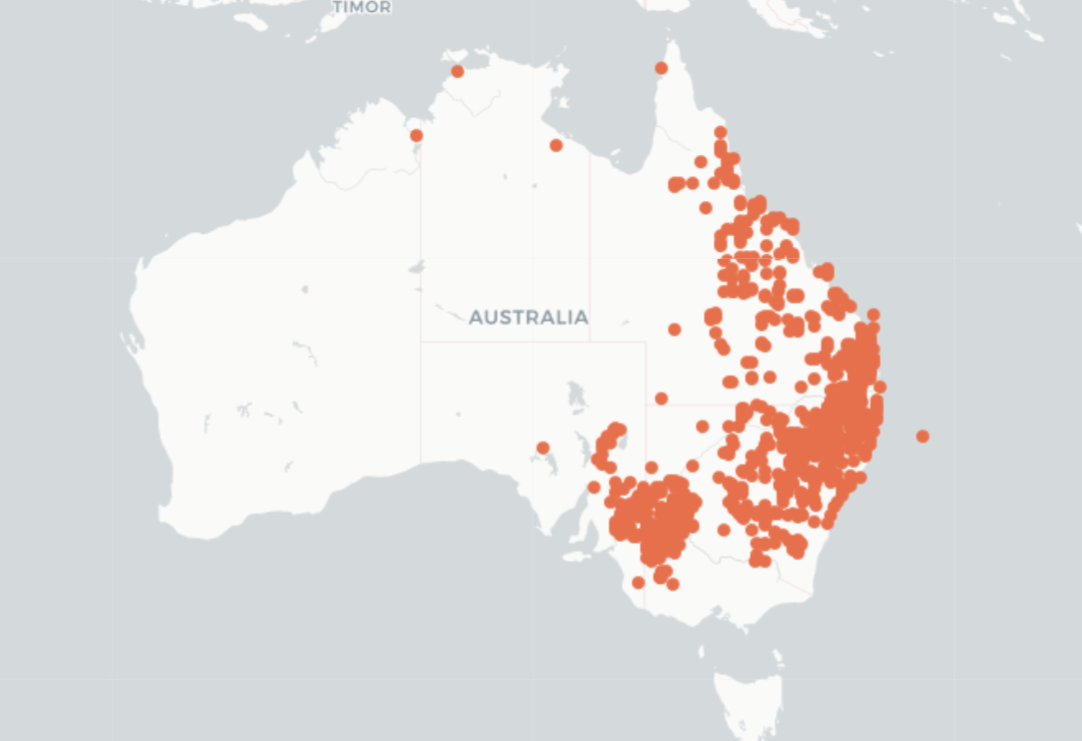
Distribution of Diporiphora nobbi (Nobbi Dragon) Across Eastern Australia

Diporiphora nobbi, also known commonly as the nobbi lashtail or the nobbi, is a species of lizard in the family Agamidae. The species is endemic to Australia.

== Ecology ==
The Nobbi Dragon, Diporiphora nobbi, is a lizard species endemic to Northern and Eastern Australia. A part of the family Agamidae which is commonly known as the Dragon Family. The Nobbi Dragon reaches lengths of 20 cm long from the snout to tail, with specific colourations of browns and blacks with two distinct strips running horizontally along its back beginning at the head and finishing at the end of the tail on either side of the spine. The Nobbi Dragon can also be identified as having less than 20 dorsal scale rows at the level of the axilla deferring from other diporiphora species. They reside near and in shrubbery of tree trunks, in arid shrublands, savannas and forests, running on their hind legs when threatened. The Nobbi Dragon is a part of the Diporiphora genus which has 21 species which is distinct from other Agamidae species due to their climbing ability and morphological attributes. Like other reptiles the Nobbi Dragon reproduces sexual and is a oviparous animal laying eggs and embryo's developing inside the eggs. The Nobbi Dragon is a Carnivore that primarily consumes insects and other small invertebrates. They hunt by waiting in an ambush position for their prey, then lashing out, grabbing their prey with their mouths at speed, when within striking distance.

== Distribution ==
D. nobbi is found in the Australian states of New South Wales, Queensland, South Australia, and Victoria. This range extends predominantly from the Northern Queensland down along the central and eastern regions through to New South Wales, down and west to North-western Victoria and South-eastern South Australia. With Small Patches identified in the North end of the Northern Territory The preferred natural habitats of D. nobbi are shrubland, savanna, and forest. The Nobbi Dragon is distributed across a variety of environments and ecosystems in Australia, from rainforests, dry woodlands, coastal swamplands and vegetation, cool temperate forests and uplands, and dry mallee and spinifex woodlands. This wide distribution has contributed to large amounts of variation in morphological characteristics such as size and colouration. Inside these environments the Nobbi Dragon inhabits the understory layer in dry spinifex grass as well as trunks and hollows, for food and shelter.

== Conservation ==
The Conservation status of the Nobbi Dragon is of Least concern on the International Union for Conservation of Nature Red List. It has been determined that although the Nobbi Dragon is highly sensitive to habitat modification, caused directly or indirectly from humans, the species occupies a very large geographical range spanning from North-eastern to South-eastern Australia where they are determined as common as well as the species having the ability to persist in a variety of woodland and shrubland environments. Thereby from this Status there are no specific regulations, programs, or legislation protecting the Diporiphora nobbi, from direct or indirect human pressures.

== Evolutionary Relationship & Traits ==
The Diporiphora nobbi was first described and established as a new species by Witten (1972) and describing it as a member of the Amphibolurus muricatus species groups differing from the Diporiphora sub species group and was formally named the Amphibolurus nobbi. It was later distinguished that the morphological genetic material traits present within the Nobbi species were the same as the Diporiphora and the species were combined as a singular species. Currently there are two described subspecies of the Nobbi Dragon, these are the D. n. nobbi and the D. n. phaeospinosa. The differentiation of the two subspecies within the Nobbi Dragon is attributed to the vast geographical range, variation and biogeographical barriers contributing to different populations of the Nobbi Dragon adapting and micro evolving to form slight nuance changes in their morphological traits, size, shape and colouration. An example of this is the differing colouration at the base of their tails between individual populations, with some displaying a purple, pink, or reddish colour, whereas others display bright yellow. Between the two subspecies are four differing physical traits distinguishing them. These traits are the arrangement of the postauricular spines on the side of their head behind the ear. The upper auricular spines and nuchal spine arrangement on the base of the head and neck. The paravertebral and dorsa-lateral scale keeling and regularity along the top and side of their back. The dorsa-lateral scale arrangement and keeling of their body scales. And the difference between the strength of the scale keeling and individual scale pattern composition.
