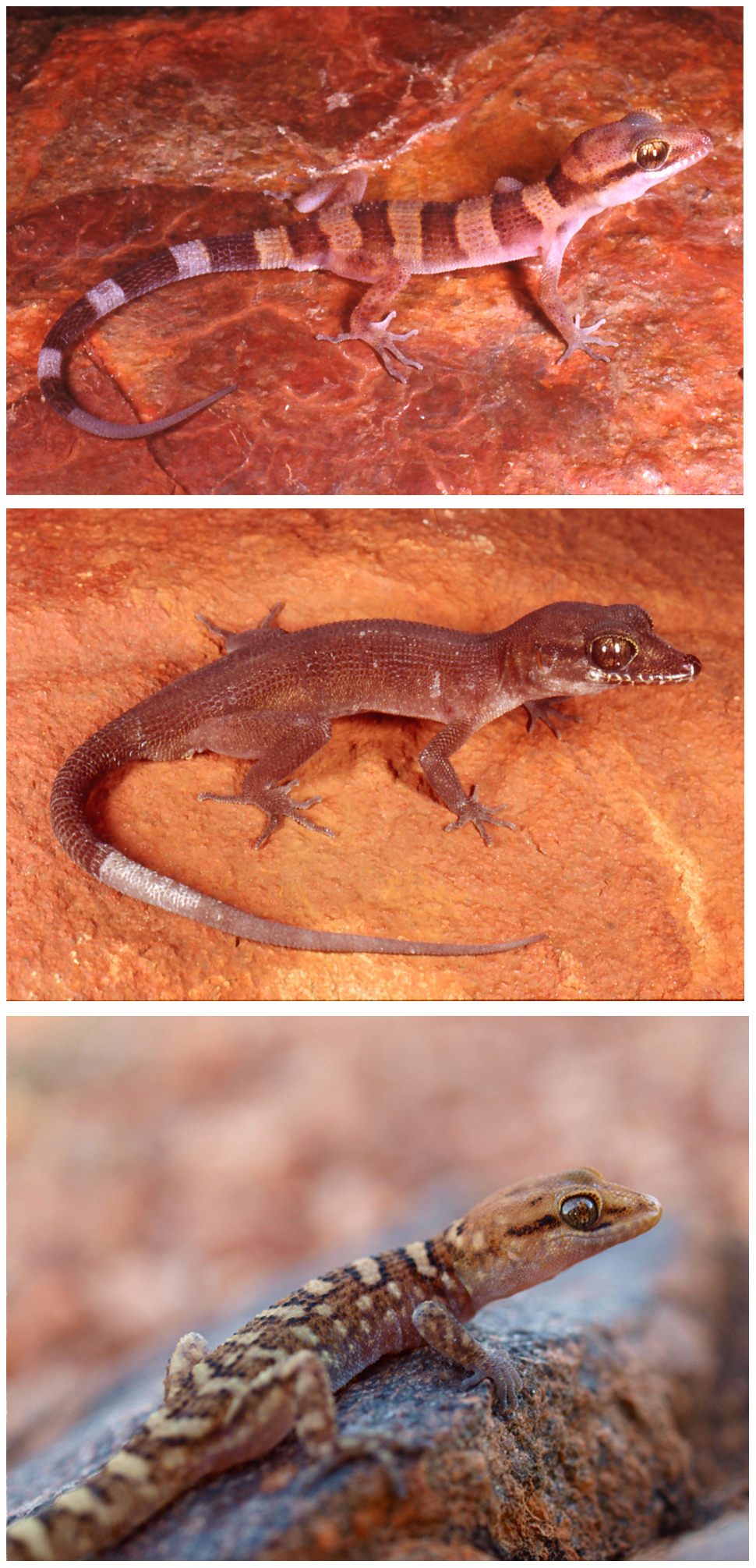
- Heteronotia spelea in life: Paraburdoo, WA (image: B. Maryan) (Top); Heteronotia atra in life: 5 km south of Lake Poongkaliyarra, WA (image: B. Maryan) (Middle); Heteronotia fasciolatus in life: Harts Range, central Australia, NT (image: M. Pepper).(Bottom)

Scientific classification
- Kingdom: Animalia
- Phylum: Chordata
- Class: Reptilia
- Order: Squamata
- Suborder: Gekkota
- Family: Gekkonidae
- Subfamily: Gekkoninae
- Genus: Heteronotia; Wermuth, 1965

Species
- Five, see text.

= Heteronotia =

Genus of lizards

Heteronotia is a genus of geckos, lizards in the family Gekkonidae. The genus is endemic to Australia. Species in the genus Heteronotia are commonly known as prickly geckos.

== Species ==
The following five species are recognized as being valid.

- Heteronotia atra Pepper et al., 2013 – black Pilbara gecko
- Heteronotia binoei (Gray, 1845) – Bynoe's gecko, prickly gecko
- Heteronotia fasciolata Pepper et al., 2013 – pale-headed gecko
- Heteronotia planiceps Storr, 1989 – Bynoe's prickly gecko
- Heteronotia spelea (Kluge, 1963) – cave prickly gecko, Pilbara cave gecko, desert cave gecko

Note: a binomial authority in parentheses indicates that the species was originally described in a genus other than Heteronotia.
