= Diporiphora linga =

Conservation status
- Least Concern (IUCN 3.1)

Scientific classification
- Kingdom: Animalia
- Phylum: Chordata
- Class: Reptilia
- Order: Squamata
- Suborder: Iguania
- Family: Agamidae
- Genus: Diporiphora
- Species: D. linga

Binomial name
- Diporiphora linga Houston, 1977
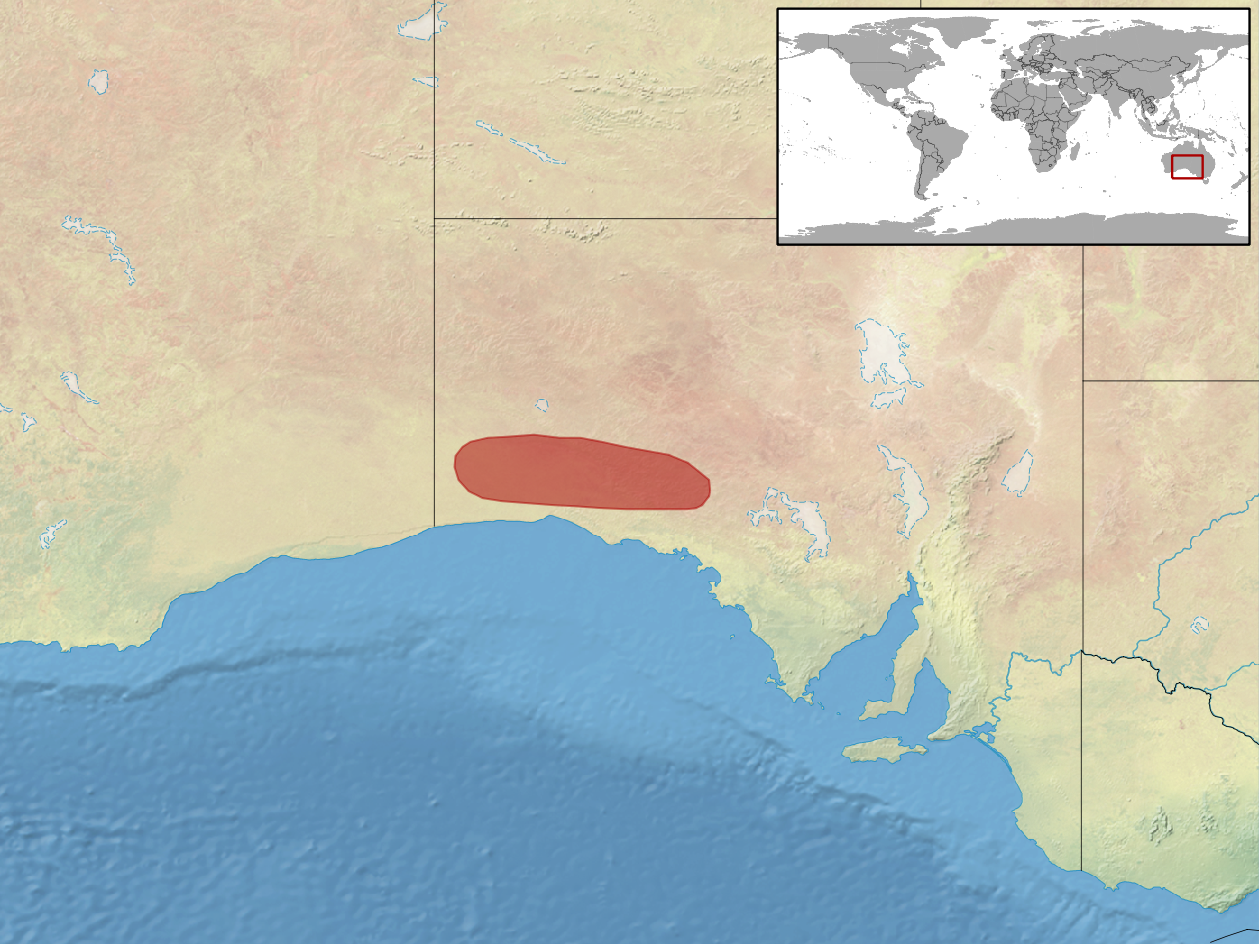

Species of lizard

Diporiphora linga, the pink two-line dragon, is a species of agama found in Australia.
