= Crenadactylus occidentalis =

Conservation status
- Least Concern (IUCN 3.1)

Scientific classification
- Kingdom: Animalia
- Phylum: Chordata
- Class: Reptilia
- Order: Squamata
- Suborder: Gekkota
- Family: Diplodactylidae
- Genus: Crenadactylus
- Species: C. occidentalis

Binomial name
- Crenadactylus occidentalis Doughty, Ellis, & Oliver, 2016

Species of gecko

Crenadactylus occidentalis, also called the western clawless gecko, is a species of gecko endemic to the western coast of Australia.

== Taxonomy ==
Crenadactylus occidentalis was first described in a taxonomic revision in 2016 of rare and poorly known geckos of the genus Crenadactylus, assembling evidence of greatly under-estimated speciation previously only recognised as subspecies of monotypic genus. One of four new species to emerge from molecular studies that had reported chromosomal distinctions that indicated the population's divergence around twenty to thirty million years ago. The holotype was collect by Brad Maryan and Robert Browne-Cooper during April in 1992 at Dirk Hartog Island.

Crenadactylus ocellatus, found in a wider distribution of Southwest Australia, has also been referred to as the western clawless gecko. Prior to the revision in 2016, the population had been identified as two 'forms' found at adjacent ranges in the western regions of Australia and tentatively recognised as subspecies C. ocellatus ocellatus (southwestern clawless gecko) and C. ocellatus horni (central west coast clawless gecko).

== Description ==
A species of Crenadactylus, all of which differ in subtle details of their appearance but with deep divergence in the genome that indicates long periods of geographic isolation (20–30 mya). C. occidentalis has a relatively wide head and medium size, the snout vent length is recorded as 32.6 millimetres. The base colour over the body is tan and light brown. The striping common to the genus is distinctly contrasted, occasionally broken by spots where a few scales are yellow or white.

== Distribution and habitat ==
Records of Crenadactylus occidentalis are at altitudes less than 100 metres asl. The distribution range of the species is restricted to sub-coastal and coastal habitat in Western Australia, from Carnarvon to the south beyond the Northwest Cape to Yardie Creek. The range includes offshore areas near Carnarvon and at Shark Bay on Dorre and Berniers. The vegetation type of their habitat is composed of grass mounds of spinifex country and low coastal shrub-lands, dominated by banksia and acacia species. C. occidentalis has been located in waste piles associated with recent human habitation of the rural region.

== Conservation status ==
The IUCN has classified the species as least concern and notes the species is located within at least one conservation zone of an extensive area of coastline. No specific conservation plan has assessed and evaluated threatening factors to the population, although the species is recognised for the purposes of conservation assessment. The quality and area of extent is noted as declining. Crenadactylus occidentalis is thought to be uncommon, although the lack of specific research, surveys and former position as a hidden species within Crenadactylus leaves some uncertainty about its population structure.
