= Diporiphora albilabris =

Conservation status
- Least Concern (IUCN 3.1)

Scientific classification
- Kingdom: Animalia
- Phylum: Chordata
- Class: Reptilia
- Order: Squamata
- Suborder: Iguania
- Family: Agamidae
- Genus: Diporiphora
- Species: D. albilabris

Binomial name
- Diporiphora albilabris Storr, 1974
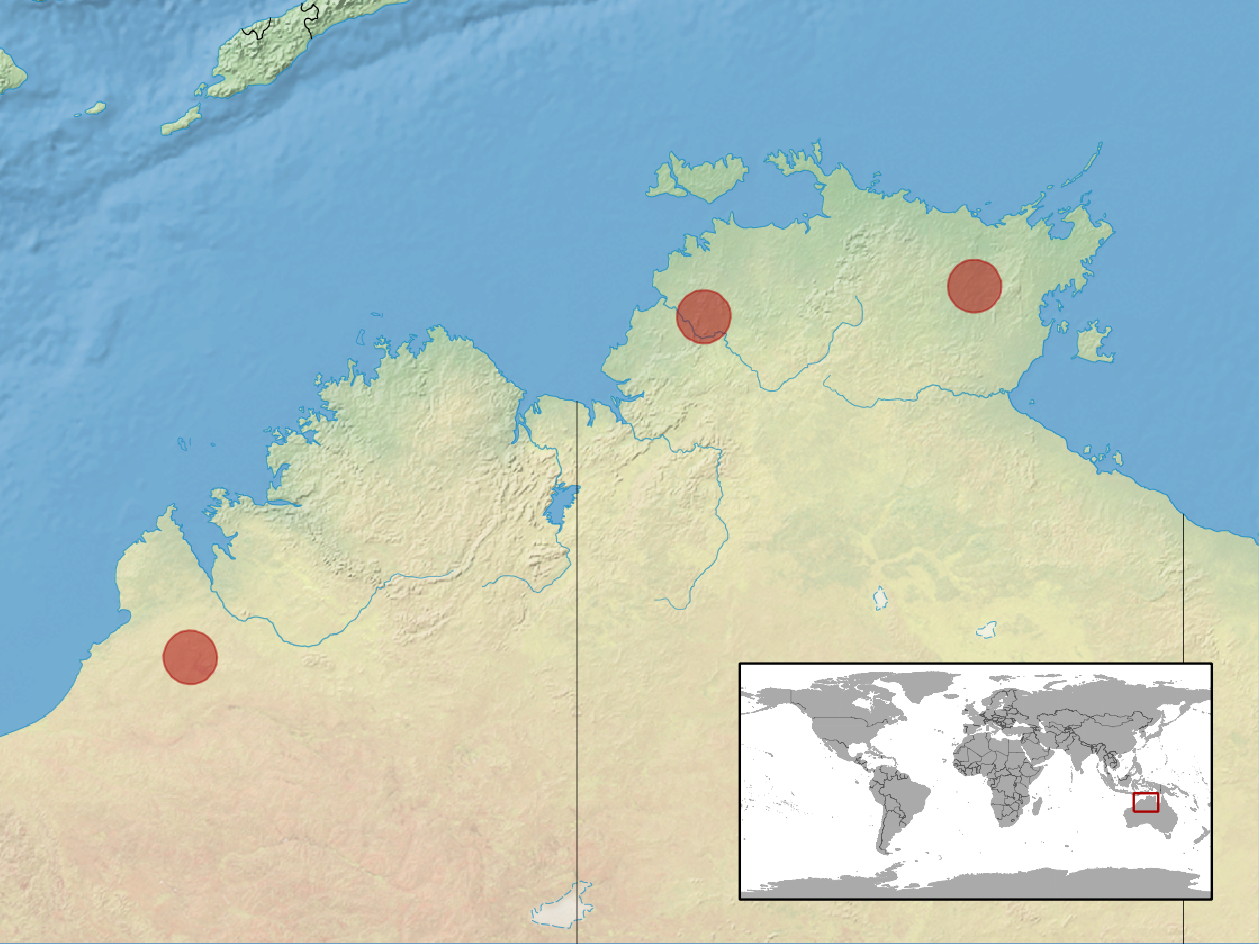

Species of lizard

Diporiphora albilabris, the white-lipped two-line dragon or tar tar lizard, is a species of agama found in Australia.
