= Diporiphora convergens =

Conservation status
- Data Deficient (IUCN 3.1)

Scientific classification
- Kingdom: Animalia
- Phylum: Chordata
- Class: Reptilia
- Order: Squamata
- Suborder: Iguania
- Family: Agamidae
- Genus: Diporiphora
- Species: D. convergens

Binomial name
- Diporiphora convergens Storr, 1974
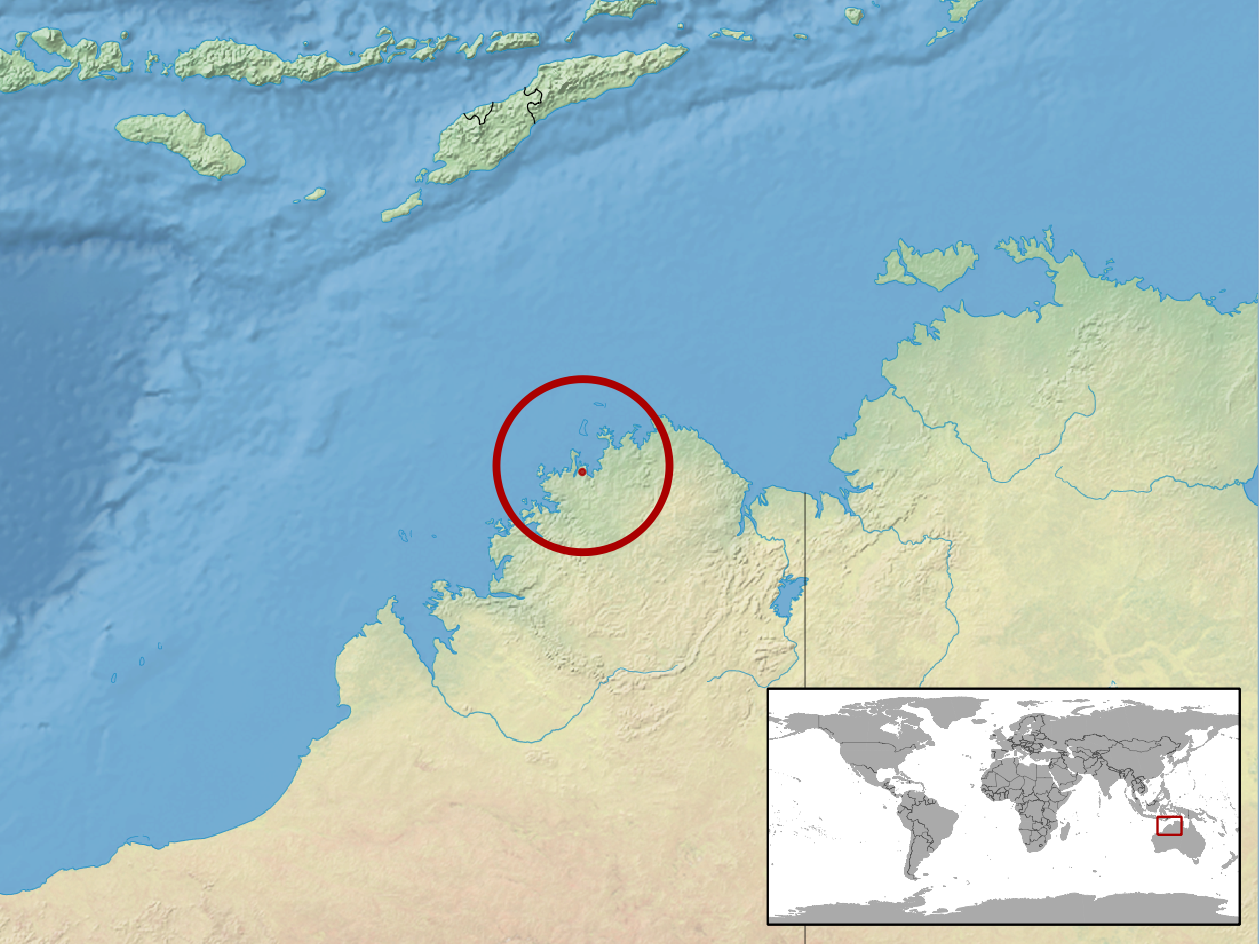

Species of lizard

Diporiphora convergens, the Crystal Creek two-lined dragon, is a species of agama found in Australia.

The species is known only from its type specimen, collected at Crystal Creek in the northern Kimberley of Western Australia, and has not been collected again.
