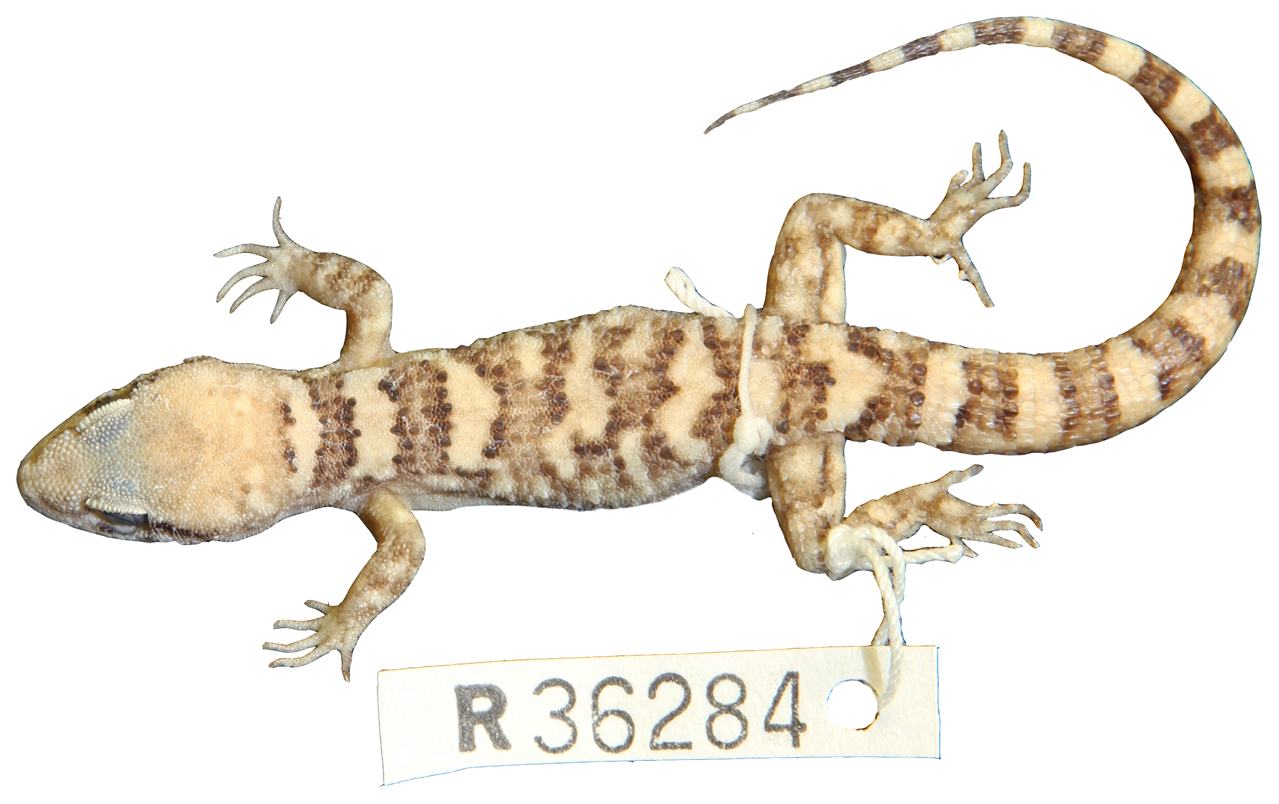

Conservation status
- Least Concern (IUCN 3.1)

Scientific classification
- Kingdom: Animalia
- Phylum: Chordata
- Class: Reptilia
- Order: Squamata
- Suborder: Gekkota
- Family: Gekkonidae
- Genus: Heteronotia
- Species: H. fasciolata

Binomial name
- Heteronotia fasciolata Pepper, Doughty, Fujita, Moritz, & Keogh, 2013

Synonyms
- Heteronotia fasciolatus

= Pale-headed gecko =

Species of lizard

The pale-headed gecko (Heteronotia fasciolata) is a species of gecko. It is endemic to the Northern Territory in Australia.
