= Notoscincus butleri =

Conservation status
- Least Concern (IUCN 3.1)

Scientific classification
- Kingdom: Animalia
- Phylum: Chordata
- Class: Reptilia
- Order: Squamata
- Family: Scincidae
- Genus: Notoscincus
- Species: N. butleri

Binomial name
- Notoscincus butleri Storr, 1979

Species of lizard

Notoscincus butleri, also known commonly as Butler's snake-eyed skink, the lined soil-crevice skink, and the lined soil-crevis skink, is a species of lizard in the family Scincidae. The species is endemic to Australia.

== Etymology ==
The specific name, butleri, is in honor of Australian naturalist William Henry "Harry" Butler.

== Geographic range ==
N. butleri is found in the Pilbara region in the Australian state of Western Australia.

== Habitat ==
The preferred natural habitat of N. butleri is stony grassland.

== Reproduction ==
N. butleri is oviparous.
