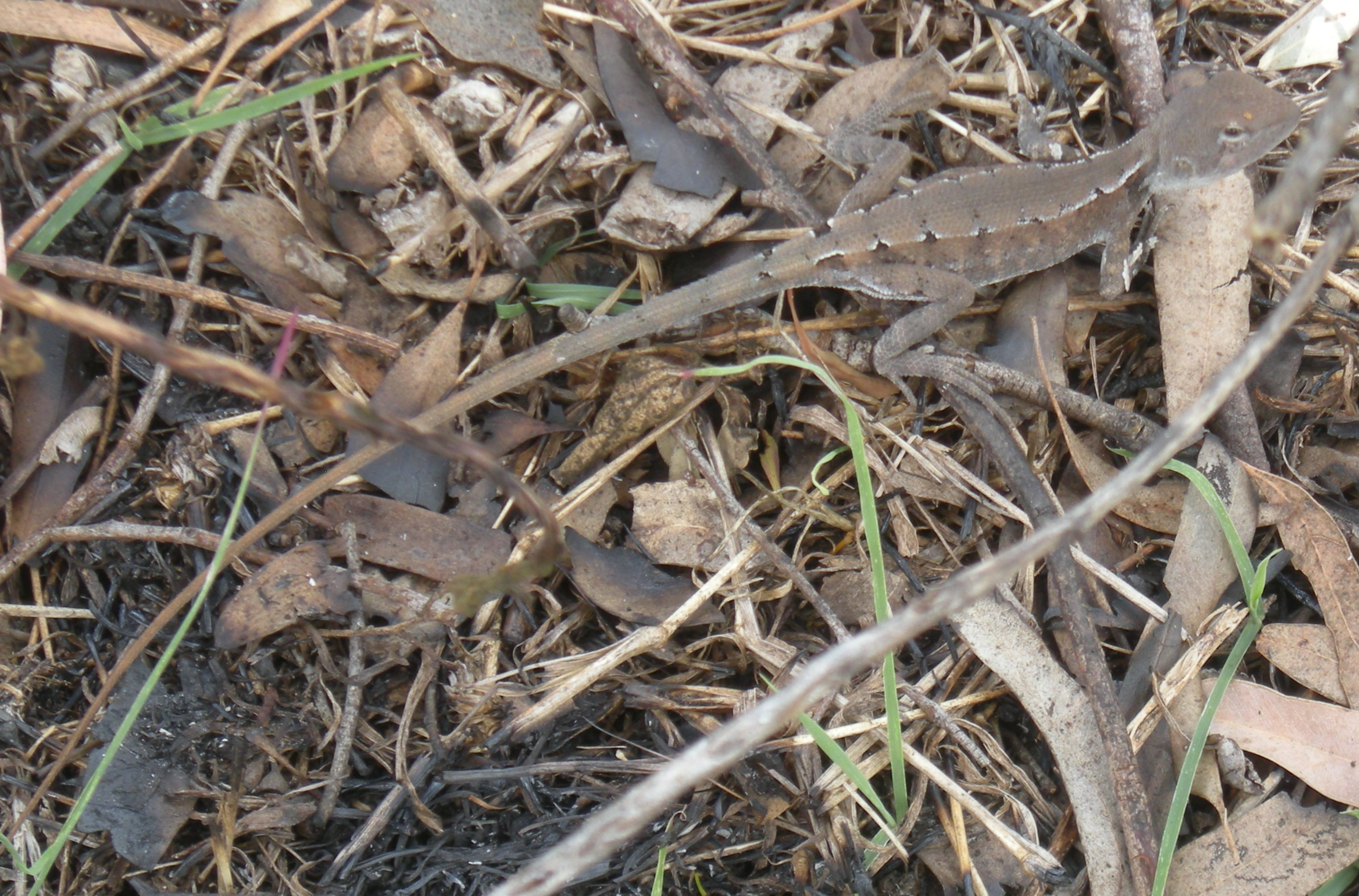
- Diporiphora australis

Scientific classification
- Kingdom: Animalia
- Phylum: Chordata
- Class: Reptilia
- Order: Squamata
- Suborder: Iguania
- Family: Agamidae
- Subfamily: Amphibolurinae
- Genus: Diporiphora; Gray, 1842

Species
- 28, see text

Synonyms
- Amphibolurus, Calotella, Gindalia, Grammatophora, Physignatus [sic], Wittenagama

= Diporiphora =

Genus of lizards

Diporiphora is a genus of lizards in the family Agamidae. Most species in the genus are endemic to Australia, but two (D. australis and D. bilineata) are also found in New Guinea.

== Species ==
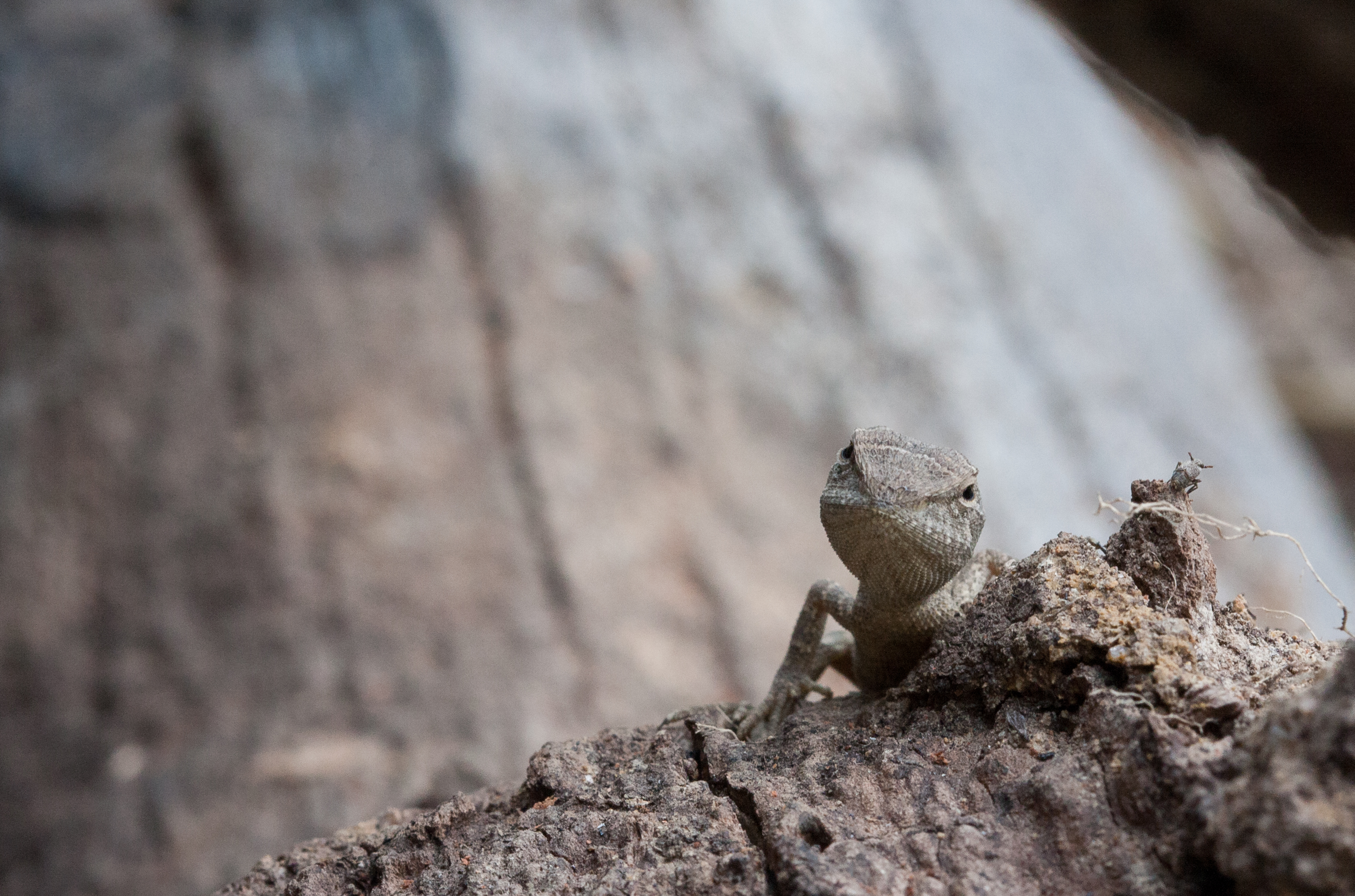
Diporiphora australis

The genus includes these 28 species which are recognized as being valid:

- Diporiphora adductus Doughty, Kealley & Melville, 2012 – Carnarvon dragon
- Diporiphora albilabris Storr, 1974 – white-lipped two-line dragon, tar tar lizard
- Diporiphora ameliae Emmott, Couper, Melville & Chapple, 2012
- Diporiphora amphiboluroides Lucas & C. Frost, 1902 – mulga dragon
- Diporiphora australis (Steindachner, 1867) – Tommy roundhead, eastern two-line dragon
- Diporiphora bennettii (Gray, 1845) – Kimberley sandstone dragon, robust two-line dragon
- Diporiphora bilineata Gray, 1842 – northern two-line dragon, two-lined dragon
- Diporiphora carpentariensis Melville, Date, Horner & Doughty, 2019 – Gulf two-lined dragon
- Diporiphora convergens Storr, 1974 – Crystal Creek two-lined dragon
- Diporiphora gracilis Melville, Date, Horner & Doughty, 2019 – gracile two-lined dragon
- Diporiphora granulifera Melville, Date, Horner & Doughty, 2019 – granulated two-lined dragon
- Diporiphora jugularis Macleay, 1877 – black-throated two-pored dragon
- Diporiphora lalliae Storr, 1974 – northern deserts dragon, Lally's two-line dragon
- Diporiphora linga Houston, 1977 – pink two-line dragon
- Diporiphora magna Storr, 1974 – yellow-sided two-lined dragon
- Diporiphora margaretae Storr, 1974
- Diporiphora nobbi (Witten, 1972) – nobbi lashtail, nobbi
- Diporiphora pallida Melville, Date, Horner & Doughty, 2019 – pale two-pored dragon
- Diporiphora paraconvergens Doughty, Kealley & Melville, 2012 – grey-striped western desert dragon
- Diporiphora perplexa Melville, Date, Horner & Doughty, 2019 – Kimberley rock dragon
- Diporiphora phaeospinosa Edwards & Melville, 2011
- Diporiphora pindan Storr, 1980 – Pindan two-line dragon, Pindan dragon
- Diporiphora reginae Glauert, 1959 – plain-backed two-line dragon
- Diporiphora sobria Storr, 1974 – northern savannah two-pored dragon
- Diporiphora superba Storr, 1974 – superb two-line dragon
- Diporiphora valens Storr, 1980 – southern Pilbara spinifex dragon, southern Pilbara tree dragon, Pilbara two-line dragon
- Diporiphora vescus Doughty, Kealley & Melville, 2012 – northern Pilbara tree dragon
- Diporiphora winneckei Lucas & C. Frost, 1896 – canegrass dragon, canegrass two-line dragon, blue-lined dragon, Winnecke's two-pored dragon
