= Cyrtodactylus kimberleyensis =

Conservation status
- Data Deficient (IUCN 3.1)

Scientific classification
- Kingdom: Animalia
- Phylum: Chordata
- Order: Squamata
- Suborder: Gekkota
- Family: Gekkonidae
- Genus: Cyrtodactylus
- Species: C. kimberleyensis

Binomial name
- Cyrtodactylus kimberleyensis Bauer & Doughty, 2012

Species of lizard

Cyrtodactylus kimberleyensis, also known as the Kimberley bent-toed gecko or East Montalivet Island gecko, is a species of gecko that is endemic to East Montalivet Island in Western Australia.

== Etymology ==
The specific epithet refers to the Kimberley region of northern Western Australia.
