= Crenadactylus pilbarensis =

Conservation status
- Least Concern (IUCN 3.1)

Scientific classification
- Kingdom: Animalia
- Phylum: Chordata
- Class: Reptilia
- Order: Squamata
- Suborder: Gekkota
- Family: Diplodactylidae
- Genus: Crenadactylus
- Species: C. pilbarensis

Binomial name
- Crenadactylus pilbarensis Doughty, Ellis, & Oliver, 2016

Species of gecko

Crenadactylus pilbarensis is a species of gecko found in the Pilbara region of Western Australia. They resemble other species of the genus Crenadactylus, tiny clawless Australian geckos found across a large area of the continent, but has persisted as an ancient lineage in a region of the northwest.

== Taxonomy ==
Unrecognised as a species before 2016, the first description was published in a revision of the genus that elevated the subspecific ranks of a single species and published this as one of three new species. The vernacular and specific epithet, pilbaraensis, refers to the only region in which it is recorded, the Pilbara craton in the northwest of Australia. A common name for the species is Pilbara clawless gecko.

== Description ==
The coloration is distinguished by their small size and contrasting light and dark stripes that appear along the length of the body. A large scale at the chin is characteristic of Crenadactylus pilbarensis.

== Habitat and range ==
Crenadactylus pilbarensis occurs at arid habitat characterised as stony gullies and slopes of hills in association with spinifex, mounds of vegetation formed by Triodia species occupying rocky outcrops in the Pilbara region. The known range extends beyond the Pilbara craton to the Burrup Peninsula and is recorded at Dolphin Island.

== Conservation status ==
Crenadactylus pilbarensis is listed at the IUCN with the conservation status as non-threatened, while noting it as new and poorly known species lacking evidence to the contrary there are no apparent threatening factors. Fire may impact local areas without affecting the trajectory of the population, and the wide distribution range reduces the species vulnerability to rapid ecological changes. C. pilbarensis is known to occur within two areas listed as protected by conservation legislation, Karlamilyi National Park and Meentheena Conservation Reserve.
