= Bynoe's prickly gecko =

Conservation status
- Least Concern (IUCN 3.1)

Scientific classification
- Kingdom: Animalia
- Phylum: Chordata
- Class: Reptilia
- Order: Squamata
- Suborder: Gekkota
- Family: Gekkonidae
- Genus: Heteronotia
- Species: H. planiceps

Binomial name
- Heteronotia planiceps Storr, 1989

Species of lizard

Bynoe's prickly gecko (Heteronotia planiceps) is a species of gecko. It is endemic to Australia.
