= Diporiphora carpentariensis =

Scientific classification
- Kingdom: Animalia
- Phylum: Chordata
- Class: Reptilia
- Order: Squamata
- Suborder: Iguania
- Family: Agamidae
- Genus: Diporiphora
- Species: D. carpentariensis

Binomial name
- Diporiphora carpentariensis Melville, Date, Horner, & Doughty, 2019

Species of lizard

Diporiphora carpentariensis, the Gulf two-lined dragon, is a species of agama found in Queensland, Australia.
