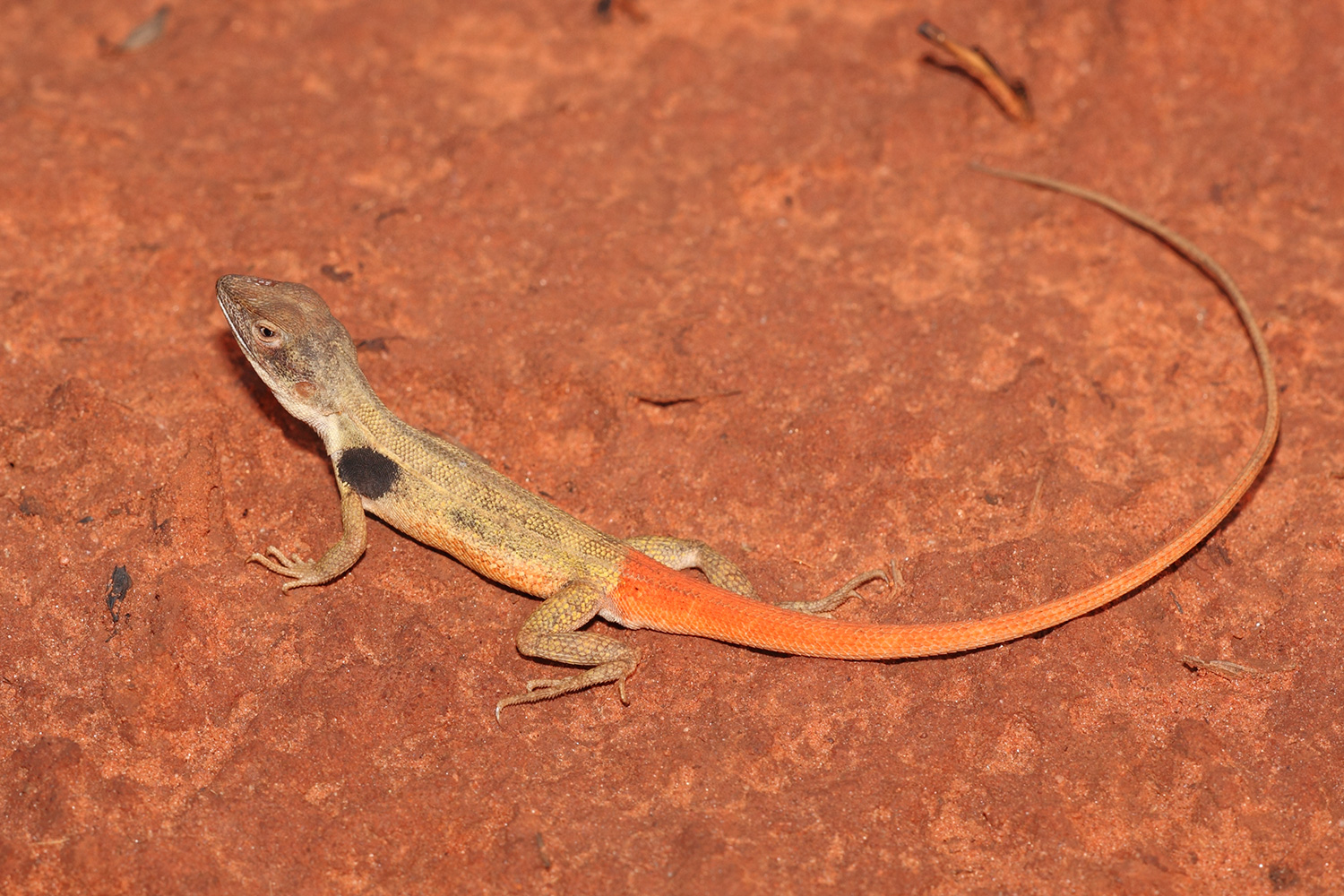

Conservation status
- Least Concern (IUCN 3.1)

Scientific classification
- Kingdom: Animalia
- Phylum: Chordata
- Class: Reptilia
- Order: Squamata
- Suborder: Iguania
- Family: Agamidae
- Genus: Diporiphora
- Species: D. magna

Binomial name
- Diporiphora magna Storr, 1974

= Diporiphora magna =

Species of lizard

Diporiphora magna, the yellow-sided two-lined dragon, is a species of agama found in Australia.
