= Southwest Kimberley clawless gecko =

Conservation status
- Least Concern (IUCN 3.1)

Scientific classification
- Kingdom: Animalia
- Phylum: Chordata
- Class: Reptilia
- Order: Squamata
- Suborder: Gekkota
- Family: Diplodactylidae
- Genus: Crenadactylus
- Species: C. rostralis

Binomial name
- Crenadactylus rostralis (Storr, 1978)

Species of gecko

The Southwest Kimberley clawless gecko (Crenadactylus rostralis) is a species of gecko endemic to Western Australia in Australia.
