= Notoscincus ornatus =

Conservation status
- Least Concern (IUCN 3.1)

Scientific classification
- Kingdom: Animalia
- Phylum: Chordata
- Class: Reptilia
- Order: Squamata
- Suborder: Scinciformata
- Infraorder: Scincomorpha
- Family: Sphenomorphidae
- Genus: Notoscincus
- Species: N. ornatus

Binomial name
- Notoscincus ornatus (Broom, 1896)

Species of lizard

The ornate soil-crevice skink (Notoscincus ornatus) is a species of skink found in Australia.

== Geographic range ==
The ornate soil-crevice skink (N. ornatus) is known to be found from the far north of Western Australia, the Northern Territory, Queensland, to South Australia. The subspecies N. ornatus wotjulum is found in the tropical north coast and hinterland, whereas the subspecies N. ornatus ornatus is generally not.
