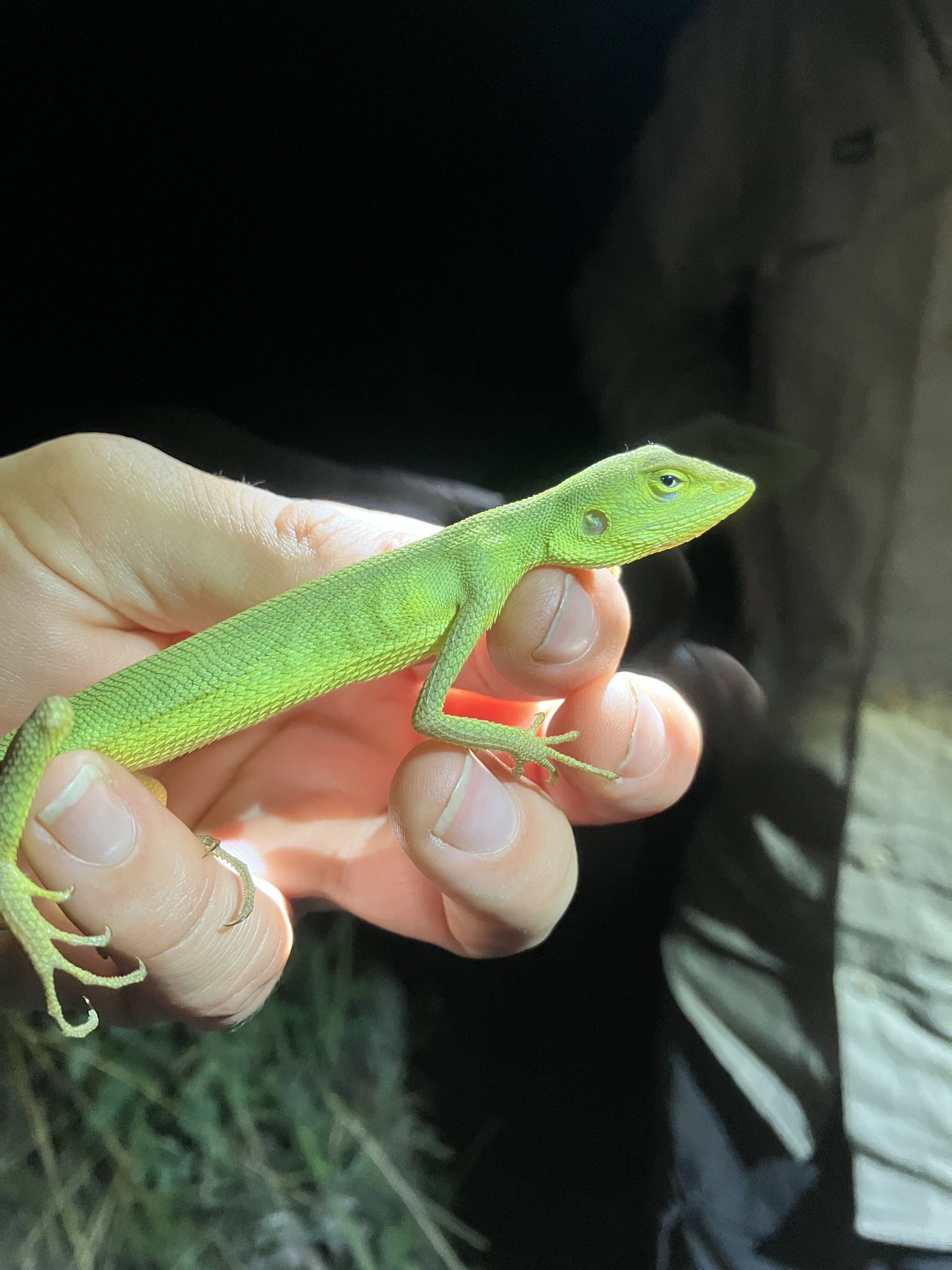

Conservation status
- Least Concern (IUCN 3.1)

Scientific classification
- Kingdom: Animalia
- Phylum: Chordata
- Class: Reptilia
- Order: Squamata
- Suborder: Iguania
- Family: Agamidae
- Genus: Diporiphora
- Species: D. superba

Binomial name
- Diporiphora superba Storr, 1974

= Diporiphora superba =

Species of lizard

Diporiphora superba, commonly known as the superb two-line dragon, is a species of agama found in Australia.
