= Notoscincus =

Scientific classification
- Domain: Eukaryota
- Kingdom: Animalia
- Phylum: Chordata
- Class: Reptilia
- Order: Squamata
- Family: Scincidae
- Subfamily: Sphenomorphinae
- Genus: Notoscincus; Fuhn, 1969

Genus of lizards

Notoscincus is a genus of skinks. They are commonly known as soil-crevice skinks or snake-eyed skinks.

== Species ==
- Notoscincus butleri Storr, 1979 – lined soil-crevice skink
- Notoscincus ornatus (Broom, 1896) – ornate soil-crevice skink

Nota bene: A binomial authority in parentheses indicates that the species was originally described in a genus other than Notoscincus.
