= Diporiphora adductus =

Conservation status
- Least Concern (IUCN 3.1)

Scientific classification
- Kingdom: Animalia
- Phylum: Chordata
- Class: Reptilia
- Order: Squamata
- Suborder: Iguania
- Family: Agamidae
- Genus: Diporiphora
- Species: D. adductus

Binomial name
- Diporiphora adductus Doughty, Kealley, & Melville, 2012

Species of lizard

Diporiphora adductus, the Carnarvon dragon, is a species of agama found in Australia.
