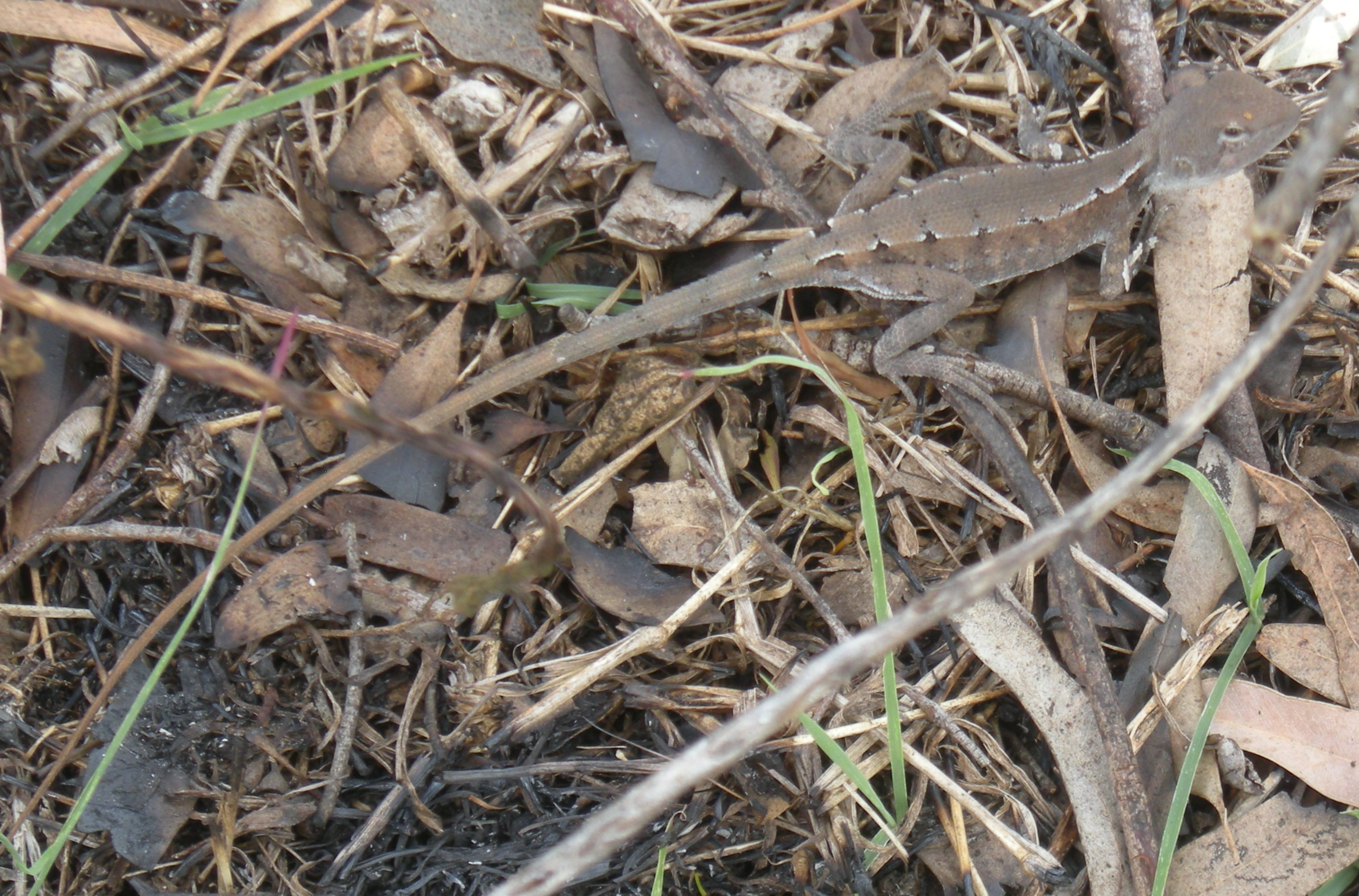

Conservation status
- Least Concern (IUCN 3.1)

Scientific classification
- Kingdom: Animalia
- Phylum: Chordata
- Class: Reptilia
- Order: Squamata
- Suborder: Iguania
- Family: Agamidae
- Genus: Diporiphora
- Species: D. australis

Binomial name
- Diporiphora australis (Steindachner, 1867)

= Diporiphora australis =

Species of lizard

Diporiphora australis, the Tommy roundhead or eastern two-line dragon, is a species of agama found in Australia and Papua New Guinea.
