= Paul Doughty =

- Born: Paul Edward Doughty; 23 March 1965 (age 61); Argentia, Newfoundland and Labrador, Canada
- Education: University of Tennessee, University of Sydney
- Known for: Research on Australian lizards and frogs; taxonomy of amphibians and reptiles
- Scientific career
- Fields: Herpetology
- Workplaces: Western Australian Museum
- Thesis: Life-history evolution in Australian lizards: allometric, energetic and comparative perspectives (1996)
- Doctoral advisor: Richard Shine

Paul Edward Doughty (born 23 March 1965) is a Canadian–Australian herpetologist.

== Biography ==
Doughty is the son of James and Barbara Doughty. After attending various primary and secondary schools, he began his academic career in 1983 at the North Seattle Community College. He then transferred to the University of Washington in Seattle, where he earned a Bachelor of Science with distinction in Zoology in 1988. He completed his master's degree at the University of Tennessee, focusing on the behavior of the side-blotched lizard (Uta stansburiana) in California, and submitted his thesis The causes and consequences of natal dispersal in the side-blotched lizard (Uta stansburiana, Phrynosomatidae) in 1991.

In 1992, Doughty moved to Sydney, and in 1996 he received his Ph.D. from the University of Sydney under the supervision of Richard Shine, with the dissertation Life-history evolution in Australian lizards: allometric, energetic and comparative perspectives. As a postdoctoral researcher, he worked at the University of Western Australia in Perth with Dale Roberts on the ecology of tadpoles. During the late 1990s, he also worked on projects concerning lizards, fish, fruit flies, and aspects of the philosophy of science. From 2000 to 2001, he was a postdoctoral fellow with the Australian Research Council. Since 2003, he has been a research scientist and curator in the Department of Terrestrial Zoology at the Western Australian Museum.

Doughty’s research focuses on the systematics of frogs and geckos, the taxonomy of other reptile groups such as agamid lizards, skinks, and snakes, as well as field surveys aimed at discovering new species and recording new distributions. His work also explores evolutionary and ecological processes related to species native to Western Australia. He conducts taxonomic studies of reptiles and amphibians using the museum’s collections and participates in fieldwork in collaboration with the Department of Biodiversity, Conservation and Attractions (DBCA) and university researchers.

Doughty represents the Western Australian Museum at conferences and committees focused on frogs and reptiles. He coordinates the Alcoa Frog Watch Program, serves as a consultant to governmental agencies, gives regular lectures, and communicates with the media about the herpetological research of the museum.

In 2008, Doughty contributed to the publication Papers in Honour of Carolus Linnaeus (1707–1788).

== Species described ==
Amphibians

- Litoria axillaris (Doughty, 2011)
- Uperoleia micra (Doughty & Roberts, 2008)
- Arenophryne xiphorhyncha (Doughty & Edwards, 2008)
- Litoria staccato (Doughty & Anstis, 2007)
- Crinia fimbriata (Doughty, Anstis & Price, 2009)
- Uperoleia saxatilis (Catullo, Doughty, Roberts & Keogh, 2011)
- Uperoleia stridera (Catullo, Doughty & Keogh, 2014)
- Ranoidea occidentalis (Anstis, Price, Roberts, Catalano, Hines, Doughty & Donnellan, 2016)
- Litoria aurifera (Anstis, Tyler, Roberts, Price & Doughty, 2010)
- Litoria ridibunda (Donnellan, Catullo, Rowley, Doughty, Price, Hines & Richards, 2023)

Reptiles

- Acanthophis cryptamydros (Maddock, Ellis, Doughty, Smith & Wüster, 2015)
- Anilios obtusifrons (Ellis & Doughty, 2017)
- Anilios systenos (Ellis & Doughty, 2017)
- Crenadactylus occidentalis (Doughty, Ellis & Oliver, 2016)
- Crenadactylus pilbarensis (Doughty, Ellis & Oliver, 2016)
- Crenadactylus tuberculatus (Doughty, Ellis & Oliver, 2016)
- Ctenophorus nguyarna (Doughty, Maryan, Melville & Austin, 2007)
- Ctenotus pallasotus (Rabosky & Doughty, 2017)
- Ctenotus rhabdotus (Rabosky & Doughty, 2017)
- Cyrtodactylus kimberleyensis (Bauer & Doughty, 2012)
- Diplodactylus calcicolus (Hutchinson, Doughty & Oliver, 2009)
- Diplodactylus capensis (Doughty, Oliver & Adams, 2008)
- Diplodactylus galaxias (Doughty, Pepper & Keogh, 2010)
- Diplodactylus lateroides (Doughty & Oliver, 2013)
- Diplodactylus nebulosus (Doughty & Oliver, 2013)
- Diplodactylus wiru (Hutchinson, Doughty & Oliver, 2009)
- Diporiphora adductus (Doughty, Kealley & Melville, 2012)
- Diporiphora carpentariensis (Melville, Date, Horner & Doughty, 2019)
- Diporiphora gracilis (Melville, Date, Horner & Doughty, 2019)
- Diporiphora granulifera (Melville, Date, Horner & Doughty, 2019)
- Diporiphora pallida (Melville, Date, Horner & Doughty, 2019)
- Diporiphora paraconvergens (Doughty, Kealley & Melville, 2012)
- Diporiphora perplexa (Melville, Date, Horner & Doughty, 2019)
- Diporiphora vescus (Doughty, Kealley & Melville, 2012)
- Egernia cygnitos (Doughty, Kealley & Donnellan, 2011)
- Egernia eos (Doughty, Kealley & Donnellan, 2011)
- Egernia epsisolus (Doughty, Kealley & Donnellan, 2011)
- Eremiascincus musivus (Mecke, Doughty & Donnellan, 2009)
- Eremiascincus phantasmus (Mecke, Doughty & Donnellan, 2013)
- Eremiascincus rubiginosus (Mecke & Doughty, 2018)
- Gehyra arnhemica (Oliver, Prasetya, Tedeschi, Fenker, Ellis, Doughty & Moritz, 2020)
- Gehyra calcitectus (Oliver, Prasetya, Tedeschi, Fenker, Ellis, Doughty & Moritz, 2020)
- Gehyra capensis (Kealley, Doughty, Pepper, Keogh, Hillyer & Huey, 2018)
- Gehyra chimera (Oliver, Prasetya, Tedeschi, Fenker, Ellis, Doughty & Moritz, 2020)
- Gehyra crypta (Kealley, Doughty, Pepper, Keogh, Hillyer & Huey, 2018)
- Gehyra fenestrula (Doughty, Bauer, Pepper & Keogh, 2018)
- Gehyra finipunctata (Doughty, Bauer, Pepper, Keogh & Ellis, 2018)
- Gehyra gemina (Oliver, Prasetya, Tedeschi, Fenker, Ellis, Doughty & Moritz, 2020)
- Gehyra girloorloo (Oliver, Bourke, Pratt, Doughty & Moritz, 2016)
- Gehyra granulum (Doughty, Palmer, Bourke, Tedeschi, Oliver & Moritz, 2018)
- Gehyra incognita (Kealley, Doughty, Pepper, Keogh, Hillyer & Huey, 2018)
- Gehyra lapistola (Oliver, Prasetya, Tedeschi, Fenker, Ellis, Doughty & Moritz, 2020)
- Gehyra lauta (Oliver, Prasetya, Tedeschi, Fenker, Ellis, Doughty & Moritz, 2020)
- Gehyra macra (Doughty, Bauer, Pepper & Keogh, 2018)
- Gehyra media (Doughty, Bauer, Pepper & Keogh, 2018)
- Gehyra micra (Doughty, Bauer, Pepper & Keogh, 2018)
- Gehyra multiporosa (Doughty, Palmer, Sistrom, Bauer & Donnellan, 2012)
- Gehyra ocellata (Kealley, Doughty, Pepper, Keogh, Hillyer & Huey, 2018)
- Gehyra paranana (Bourke, Doughty, Tedeschi, Oliver & Moritz, 2018)
- Gehyra peninsularis (Doughty, Bauer, Pepper & Keogh, 2018)
- Gehyra pluraporosa (Bourke, Doughty, Tedeschi, Oliver, Myers & Moritz, 2018)
- Gehyra polka (Doughty, Bauer, Pepper & Keogh, 2018)
- Gehyra pseudopunctata (Doughty, Bourke, Tedeschi, Oliver & Moritz, 2018)
- Gehyra spheniscus (Doughty, Palmer, Sistrom, Bauer & Donnellan, 2012)
- Gehyra unguiculata (Kealley, Doughty, Pepper, Keogh, Hillyer & Huey, 2018)
- Heteronotia atra (Pepper, Doughty, Fujita, Moritz & Keogh, 2013)
- Heteronotia fasciolata (Pepper, Doughty, Fujita, Moritz & Keogh, 2013)
- Lucasium bungabinna (Doughty & Hutchinson, 2008)
- Lucasium microplax (Eastwood, Doughty, Hutchinson & Pepper, 2020)
- Oedura bella (Oliver & Doughty, 2016)
- Oedura fimbria (Oliver & Doughty, 2016)
- Oedura murrumanu (Oliver, Laver, Melville & Doughty, 2014)
- Oxyuranus temporalis (Doughty, Maryan, Donnellan & Hutchinson, 2007)
- Rhynchoedura angusta (Pepper, Doughty, Hutchinson & Keogh, 2011)
- Rhynchoedura eyrensis (Pepper, Doughty, Hutchinson & Keogh, 2011)
- Rhynchoedura mentalis (Pepper, Doughty, Hutchinson & Keogh, 2011)
- Rhynchoedura sexapora (Pepper, Doughty, Hutchinson & Keogh, 2011)
- Tympanocryptis diabolicus (Doughty, Kealley, Shoo & Melville, 2015)
- Tympanocryptis fortescuensis (Doughty, Kealley, Shoo & Melville, 2015)
- Tympanocryptis pseudopsephos (Doughty, Kealley, Shoo & Melville, 2015)
- Underwoodisaurus seorsus (Doughty & Oliver, 2011)
- Varanus citrinus (Pavón-Vázquez, Esquerré, Fitch, Maryan, Doughty, Donnellan & Keogh, 2022)
- Varanus sparnus (Doughty, Kealley, Fitch & Donnellan, 2014)
