= Diporiphora valens =

Conservation status
- Least Concern (IUCN 3.1)

Scientific classification
- Kingdom: Animalia
- Phylum: Chordata
- Class: Reptilia
- Order: Squamata
- Suborder: Iguania
- Family: Agamidae
- Genus: Diporiphora
- Species: D. valens

Binomial name
- Diporiphora valens Storr, 1980

Species of lizard

Diporiphora valens, the southern Pilbara spinifex dragon, southern Pilbara tree dragon, or Pilbara two-line dragon, is a species of agama found in Australia.
