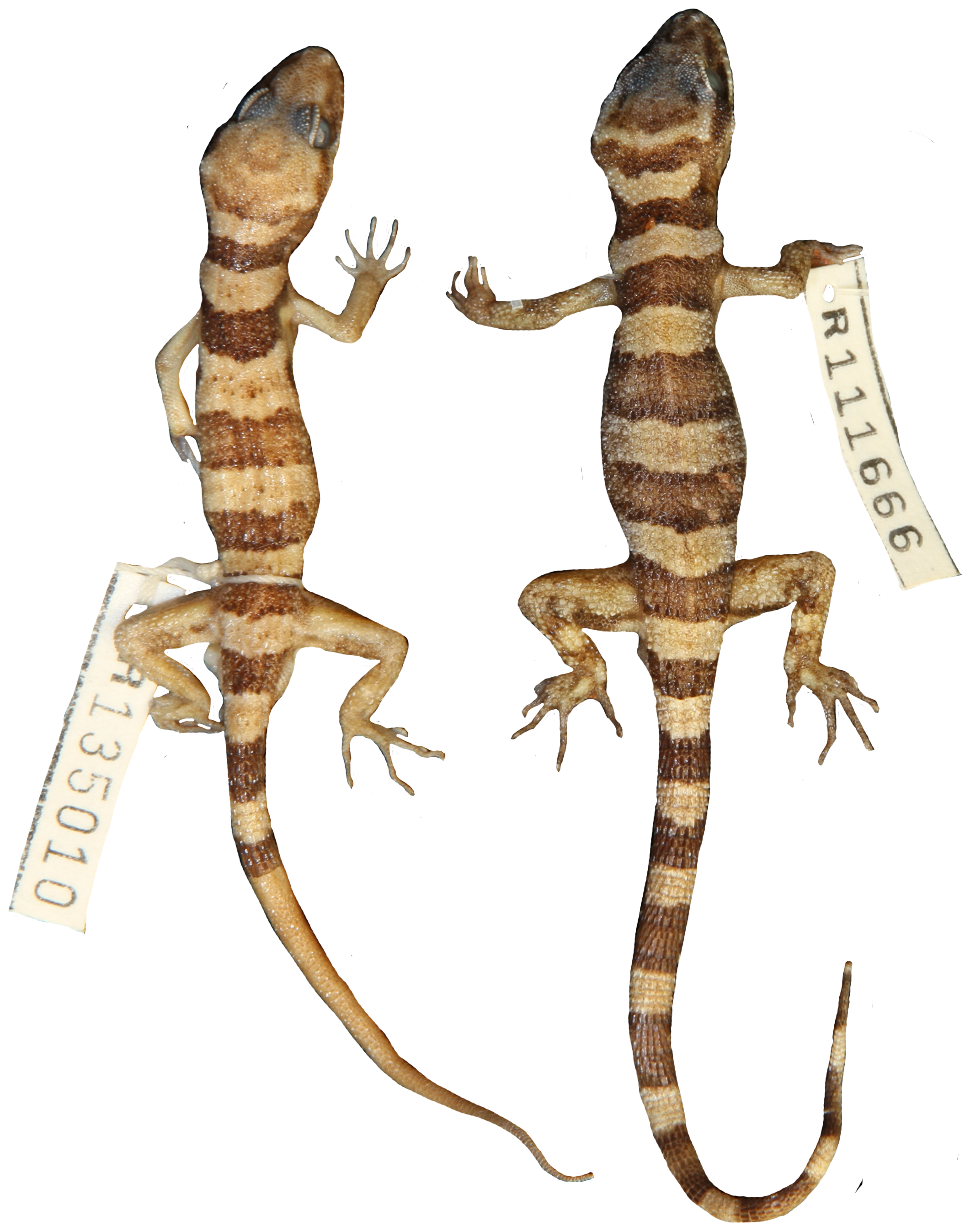

Conservation status
- Least Concern (IUCN 3.1)

Scientific classification
- Kingdom: Animalia
- Phylum: Chordata
- Class: Reptilia
- Order: Squamata
- Suborder: Gekkota
- Family: Gekkonidae
- Genus: Heteronotia
- Species: H. spelea

Binomial name
- Heteronotia spelea Kluge, 1963

= Heteronotia spelea =

Species of lizard

Heteronotia spelea, also known as Pilbara cave gecko, cave prickly gecko, or desert cave gecko, is a species of gecko. It is endemic to Australia.
