= Diporiphora pindan =

Conservation status
- Least Concern (IUCN 3.1)

Scientific classification
- Kingdom: Animalia
- Phylum: Chordata
- Class: Reptilia
- Order: Squamata
- Suborder: Iguania
- Family: Agamidae
- Genus: Diporiphora
- Species: D. pindan

Binomial name
- Diporiphora pindan Storr, 1980

Species of lizard

Diporiphora pindan, the Pindan two-line dragon or Pindan dragon, is a species of agama found in Australia.
