= Diporiphora granulifera =

Scientific classification
- Domain: Eukaryota
- Kingdom: Animalia
- Phylum: Chordata
- Class: Reptilia
- Order: Squamata
- Suborder: Iguania
- Family: Agamidae
- Genus: Diporiphora
- Species: D. granulifera

Binomial name
- Diporiphora granulifera Melville, Date, Horner, & Doughty, 2019

Species of lizard

Diporiphora granulifera, the granulated two-lined dragon, is a species of agama found in Australia.
