= Diporiphora reginae =

Conservation status
- Least Concern (IUCN 3.1)

Scientific classification
- Kingdom: Animalia
- Phylum: Chordata
- Class: Reptilia
- Order: Squamata
- Suborder: Iguania
- Family: Agamidae
- Genus: Diporiphora
- Species: D. reginae

Binomial name
- Diporiphora reginae Glauert, 1959

Species of lizard

Diporiphora reginae, the plain-backed two-line dragon, is a species of agama found in Australia.
