= Ctenotus pallasotus =

Scientific classification
- Domain: Eukaryota
- Kingdom: Animalia
- Phylum: Chordata
- Class: Reptilia
- Order: Squamata
- Family: Scincidae
- Genus: Ctenotus
- Species: C. pallasotus

Binomial name
- Ctenotus pallasotus Rabosky & Doughty, 2017

Species of lizard

Ctenotus pallasotus, the Western Pilbara lined ctenotus, is a species of skink found in Western Australia.
