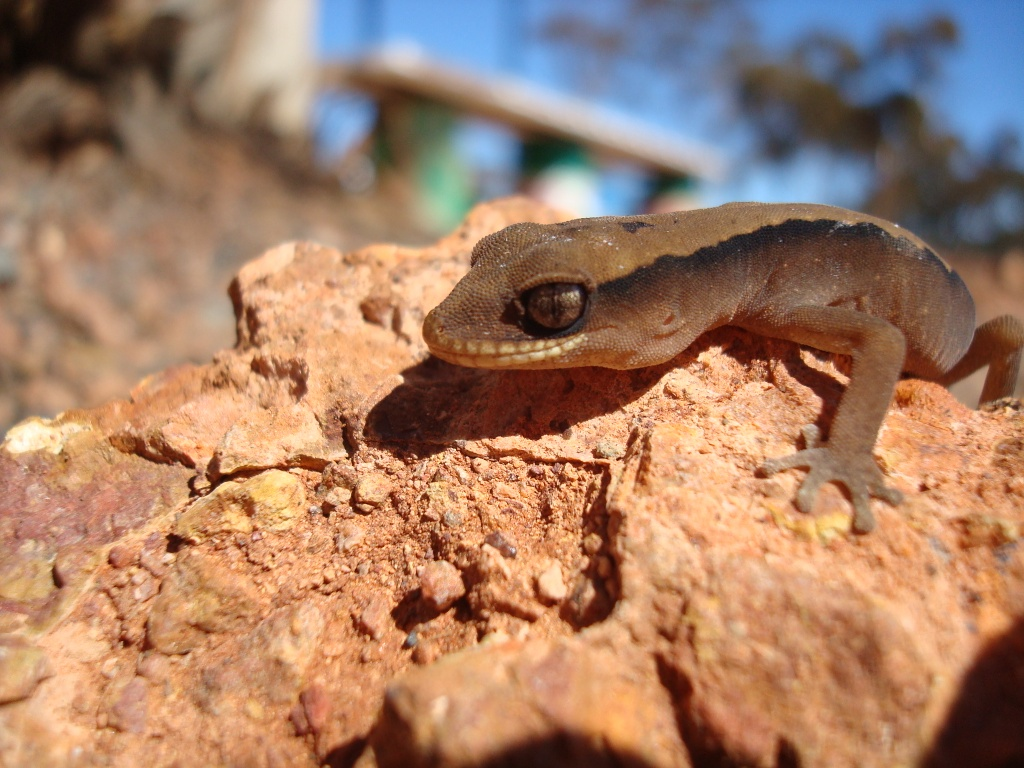
- Crenadactylus ocellatus

Scientific classification
- Kingdom: Animalia
- Phylum: Chordata
- Class: Reptilia
- Order: Squamata
- Suborder: Gekkota
- Family: Diplodactylidae
- Genus: Crenadactylus; Dixon & Kluge, 1964

= Crenadactylus =

Genus of lizards

Crenadactylus, the clawless geckos, are named for their distinguishing feature, the absence of terminal claws on the digits. They are the only Australian members of Diplodactylidae to lack claws, the endemic genus is also the smallest in size.

== Description ==
Smaller geckos found in central and western Australia, the smallest of the Gekkota species found on the continent and notable for the absence of claws at the end of any the toes. An early osteological comparison to related taxa presented considerable and unusual variation, such as being clawless, but in particular the forked arrangement of phalangeal bones within the digits of the gecko. A genus, sometimes assigned to the Diplodactylidae family, whose tiny and superficially similar species have diverged in isolation at a range of habitats across a wide geographic area.

== Taxonomy ==
The genus has been placed with the Diplodactylidae, a family allied to the Gekkota (geckos and limbless lizard species). This is a list of species recognised at the Australian Faunal Directory, the IUCN and elsewhere,

- Crenadactylus horni (Lucas & Frost, 1895) – Central Uplands clawless gecko
- Crenadactylus naso Storr, 1978 – Northern clawless gecko
- Crenadactylus occidentalis Doughty, Ellis, & Oliver, 2016 – Western clawless gecko
- Crenadactylus ocellatus (Gray, 1845)
- Crenadactylus pilbarensis Doughty, Ellis, & Oliver, 2016 – Pilbara clawless gecko
- Crenadactylus rostralis Storr, 1978 – Southwest Kimberley clawless gecko
- Crenadactylus tuberculatus Doughty, Ellis, & Oliver, 2016 – Cape Range clawless gecko

Crenadactylus was erected in 1964 by the authors James R. Dixon and Arnold G. Kluge to separate the taxon described by John Edward Gray as Diplodactylus ocellatus in 1845 and referred to as a species of Phyllodactylus, the combination published by Boulenger. The authors identified the most remarkable characteristic of the new genus, the unique morphology of the phalange structures at the end of the digits. These later authors noted Gray's description of Diplodactylus bilineatus, specimens he had separated from the type at the British Museum, and placed this in synonymy with the name Gray had published just a few lines before. Another description published by Lucas and Frost, Ebenavia horni, was also referred to Dixon and Kluge's monotypic genus. In describing the new genus, Gray's note on the source of the holotype as "W. Australia" (Western Australia) could not be refined, so this was restricted to a nominated type locality at Darlington, Western Australia, inferred by comparison to specimens found at that location.

Consideration of Crenadactylus as a single species, Crenadactylus ocellatus, was also recognised by various authorities as three to four subspecies. However, molecular evidence revealed the phylogeny of the genus indicated numerous 'hidden species', and a revision in 2016 of accepted and new descriptions recognised a total of seven species.

A molecular analysis of northern populations in 2012 examined the reported ancient divergence and up to ten lineages in northwestern Crenadactylus, with indication of geographical ranges restricted to less than 100 km^{2}. The study examined the conclusions of testing for cryptic species, published in 2010, within the poorly understood and rare populations of a purportedly monotypic species. The authors of the 2010 research had sought to test the ability of a genetic study to reveal hidden taxa, with implications for research and conservation of diversity, and the conclusion in this example was number of definable species was grossly underestimated; the authors comment on their surprise at the number of potential species discovered within a 'developed country'. The phylogenetic evidence supported the proposed divergence of populations during the Oligocene-Miocene period (circa 20–30 mya). A revision in 2016 of the genus, using genotyped specimens for a morphological study, elevated previous descriptions to the rank of species and published three new descriptions. The conclusion of the molecular and morphological revision acknowledged greater divergence within the group, and distinguishable species that have persisted in locations for millions of years.

== Distribution and habitat ==
Prior to the reclassification of the Crenadactylus species, the population was recognised as occurring in a large distribution range that covered most of the western and central regions of Australia. The various species are found in habitat that includes the leaf-layer at the floor of woodlands, underneath rocks, in hummocks of Trioda vegetation in spinifex country, under logs and other dead woody litter, and beneath the rubbish piles introduced to their environment by human activity.

The newly described species were sometime recognised as occurring in restricted ranges, becoming isolated and specialised within particular environments. The small size is a limiting factor to the species ability to move beyond the local ecology, but may have allowed them to persist in the environment with less vulnerability to the continent's climatic changes.
