= WFDC5 =

Protein-coding gene in the species Homo sapiens

Identifiers
- Aliases: WFDC5, PRG5, WAP1, dJ211D12.5, WAP four-disulfide core domain 5
- External IDs: OMIM: 605161; MGI: 2384800; GeneCards: WFDC5

Gene location (Human)
Chr.	Chromosome 20 (human)
Band	20q13.12	Start	45,109,452 bp
Band	20q13.12	End	45,115,172 bp

Gene location (Mouse)
Chr.	Chromosome 2 (mouse)
Band	2|2 H3	Start	164,018,247 bp
Band	2|2 H3	End	164,024,662 bp
RNA expression pattern
Bgee	Human / Mouse (ortholog); Top expressed in: skin of arm; skin of abdomen; skin of leg; skin of thigh; nipple; human penis; skin of hip; vulva; testicle; gingival epithelium / Top expressed in: esophagus; lip; skin of external ear; skin of back; skin of abdomen; cervix; umbilical cord; gastrula; stomach; epidermis; More reference expression data
BioGPS	n/a
Gene ontology
Molecular function	peptidase inhibitor activity; serine-type endopeptidase inhibitor activity
Cellular component	extracellular region
Biological process	negative regulation of endopeptidase activity; negative regulation of peptidase activity
Sources:Amigo / QuickGO
Orthologs
Databases	NCBI: entry; OMA: entry
Species	Human	Mouse
Entrez	149708	209232
Ensembl	ENSG00000175121	ENSMUSG00000040154
UniProt	Q8TCV5	n/a
RefSeq (mRNA)	NM_145652; NM_001395506	NM_145369
RefSeq (protein)	NP_663627	n/a
Location (UCSC)	Chr 20: 45.11 – 45.12 Mb	Chr 2: 164.02 – 164.02 Mb
PubMed search
- Wikidata
View/Edit Human	View/Edit Mouse

WAP four-disulfide core domain protein 5 is a protein that in humans is encoded by the WFDC5 gene.

This gene encodes a member of the WAP-type four-disulfide core (WFDC) domain family. Most WFDC proteins contain only one WFDC domain, and this encoded protein contains two WFDC domains. The WFDC domain, or WAP signature motif, contains eight cysteines forming four disulfide bonds at the core of the protein, and functions as a protease inhibitor. Most WFDC gene members are localized to chromosome 20q12-q13 in two clusters: centromeric and telomeric. This gene belongs to the centromeric cluster.
