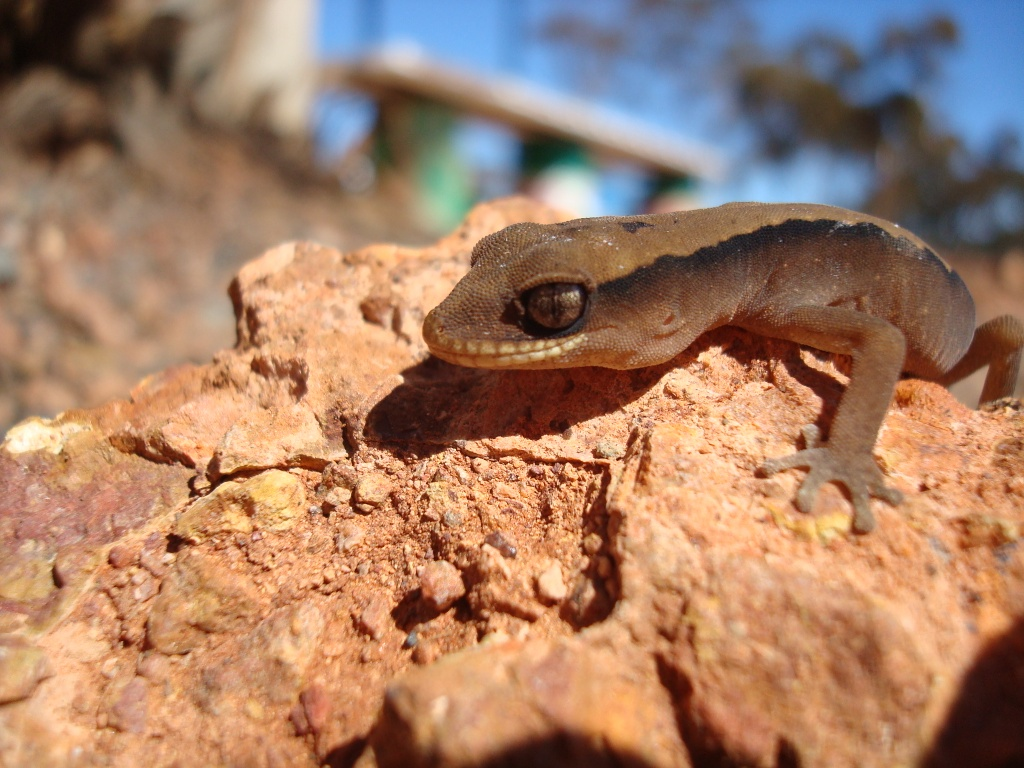

Conservation status
- Least Concern (IUCN 3.1)

Scientific classification
- Domain: Eukaryota
- Kingdom: Animalia
- Phylum: Chordata
- Class: Reptilia
- Order: Squamata
- Infraorder: Gekkota
- Family: Diplodactylidae
- Genus: Crenadactylus
- Species: C. ocellatus

Binomial name
- Crenadactylus ocellatus (Gray) 1845

= Crenadactylus ocellatus =

Species of lizard

Crenadactylus ocellatus, also known as the southwestern clawless gecko or western clawless gecko, is the smallest species of nocturnal Gecko found in Australia.

Endemic to Australia, it is distributed in the southwest of the country, and found on stony ground or in Triodia-dominated deserts. It a ground-dwelling gecko; its habitat is leaf litter, rubbish piles, and beneath rocks. It is sometimes found in the lower parts of hummock grass.

It is sometimes called the western clawless gecko, but that name is also reserved for Crenadactylus occidentalis.

== Taxonomy ==
The first description of the species was published by John Edward Gray in 1845, in a revision of specimens at the British Museum, placing his type in the genus Diplodactylus. The specimen was preserved in alcohol and noted as collected by Buchanan in Western Australia. A description of two other specimens, obtained by John Gilbert and noted as collected at "Houtman's Abrollos", was assigned to another species, Diplodactylus bilineatus, later recognised as the same taxon.

The diversity within the genus Crenadactylus has been circumscribed as a subspecific arrangement, two or three geographically identified subspecies, until a revision in 2016 elevated part of the population to a separate species.

The vernacular Gray gave for his two species names were 'the two-lined diplodactyle', for the epithet bilineatus, and 'the eyed diplodactyle' to ocellatus.
