= Hemidactylus vietnamensis =

Conservation status
- Least Concern (IUCN 3.1)

Scientific classification
- Kingdom: Animalia
- Phylum: Chordata
- Class: Reptilia
- Order: Squamata
- Suborder: Gekkota
- Family: Gekkonidae
- Genus: Hemidactylus
- Species: H. vietnamensis

Binomial name
- Hemidactylus vietnamensis Darevsky, Kupriyanova, & Roshchin, 1984

Species of lizard

Hemidactylus vietnamensis, also known as Vietnam leaf-toed gecko or Vietnam house gecko, is a species of gecko. It is endemic to Vietnam.
