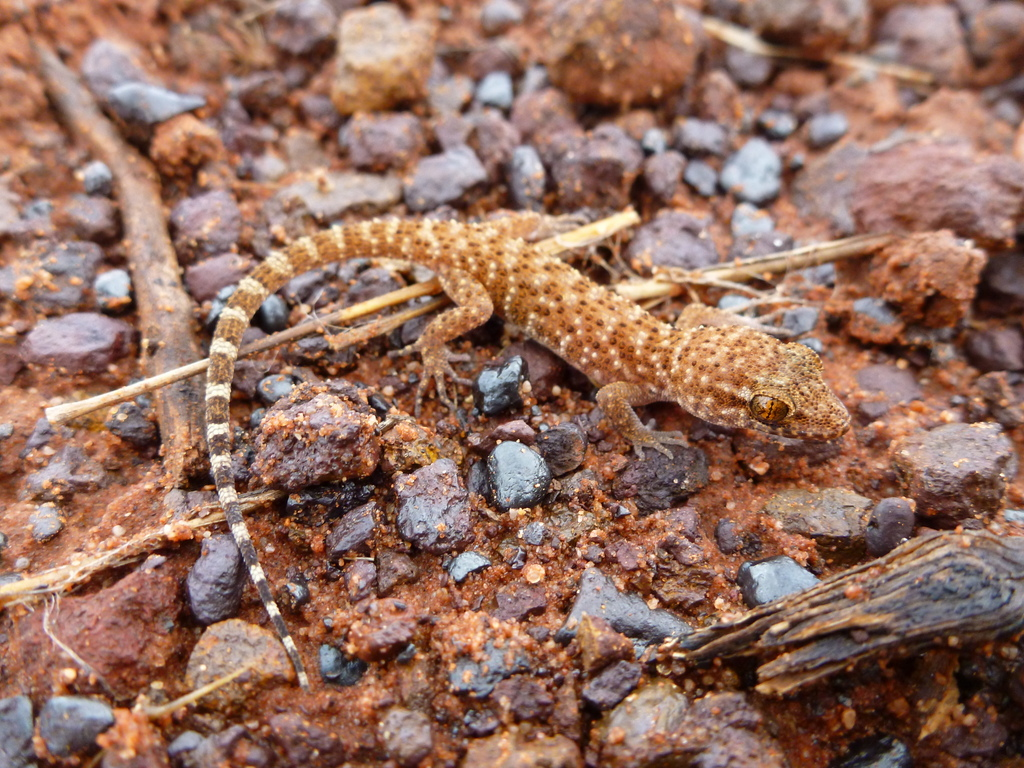

Conservation status
- Least Concern (IUCN 3.1)

Scientific classification
- Kingdom: Animalia
- Phylum: Chordata
- Class: Reptilia
- Order: Squamata
- Suborder: Gekkota
- Family: Gekkonidae
- Genus: Heteronotia
- Species: H. binoei

Binomial name
- Heteronotia binoei (Gray, 1845)

Synonyms
- Heteronota [sic] binoei Gray, 1845; Gymnodactylus binoei — A.H.A. Duméril, 1856; Heteronota [sic] binoei — Günther, 1875; Heteronotia binoei — Worrell, 1963

= Heteronotia binoei =

Species of lizard

Heteronotia binoei, known commonly as Bynoe's gecko, is a species of lizard in the family Gekkonidae, and is endemic to Australia. One of the continent's least-habitat-specific geckos, it occurs naturally across much of the country, and has also established in areas where it does not occur normally, such as urban Perth, Western Australia. It is dark brown to reddish-brown, depending on the colour of the ground upon which it lives (to which it adapts for camouflaging), as well as irregular light bands with dark edges along its back.

Bynoe's gecko is one of a small number of vertebrate species that are known to reproduce by parthenogenesis, another reptilian example being the mourning gecko (Lepidodactylus lugubris) of Southeast Asia and Oceania islands (not Australia or New Zealand).

== Etymology ==
The specific name, binoei, is in honour of British naturalist Benjamin Bynoe (1803–1865), who was a naval surgeon aboard HMS Beagle with Charles Darwin.

== Description ==
The Bynoe's gecko is a slender, long-tailed species which may grow to a total length (including tail) of 11–12 cm (4.3–4.7 in). It is covered with small scales which appear to be rough, but are soft to touch. It has slim toes which end with strong claws, but unlike many other gecko species, it does not have expandable toe pads. It has a large head and large eyes, lacking eyelids but being covered with transparent scales. To keep its eyes clean, it wipes dirt and dust from the lenses with its tongue. The body is covered with small spine like ridges which run down the length of the back, referred to in the alternative common name "prickly gecko". Colours include yellow, cream, beige, black, and white, with most carrying at least two of these colours. Stripes, speckles, spots, or blotches may cover the gecko. It usually has an indication of a dark temporal streak and another dark streak along the canthus rostralis. The lips are whitish and usually lightly freckled with a darkish brown.

Like many species of geckos, a wide array of calls can be made with its well-developed vocal chords.

== Geographic range ==
The Bynoe's gecko is found in all mainland Australia's states, except the Australian Capital Territory. It is endemic to Australia, but is not found in humid parts of the southeast and southwest. It also inhabits many islands off the west coast and has large populations on Barrow Island.

== Habitat ==
The Bynoe's gecko occurs in many habitats throughout Australia. It is most commonly found in woodlands, grasslands, and disturbed habitats, all being open and dry. It can also be found in tropical rainforests, central deserts, and coastal sand dunes. As it is a terrestrial species, it takes shelter under all types of ground cover including leaves, logs, stumps, stones, termite mounds, loose bark at the base of trees, and animal burrows. It has been found to shelter under man made habitat. Furthermore, the Bynoe's gecko is often the most abundant reptile found in many arid areas in Australia.

== Reproduction ==
In Australia, the Bynoe's gecko has been found to be in ideal breeding condition between July and September. Sexual maturity is reached in 1 to 3 years and females lay 2 eggs over the months of September to January. Eggs are soft-shelled when laid, but become hardened and brittle when exposed to the air. These eggs are usually deposited under rocks, inside animal burrows, or inside logs. Each female only produces 1 clutch per year. Females on Barrow Island reproduce by parthenogenesis, a form of asexual reproduction where the growth and development of the embryo occurs without fertilisation by a male.

Both parthenogenetic and sexual races of H. binoei occur together in areas of the Australian arid zone. When measured under laboratory conditions, the parthenogenetic geckos had about a 30% lower fecundity than their sexual progenitors.

== Diet ==
The Bynoe's gecko is mainly active at night. It leaves its shelter and hunts various invertebrates including moths and grasshoppers throughout the night. It hunts among leaf litter or in bare open spaces and will occasionally climb trees or within rocks to source food.

== Predators and threats ==
Like many other geckos, the Bynoe's gecko has many predators. It is able to flee rapidly and quickly when disturbed but is likely to still be vulnerable to attack by a range of other predators including larger lizards.
