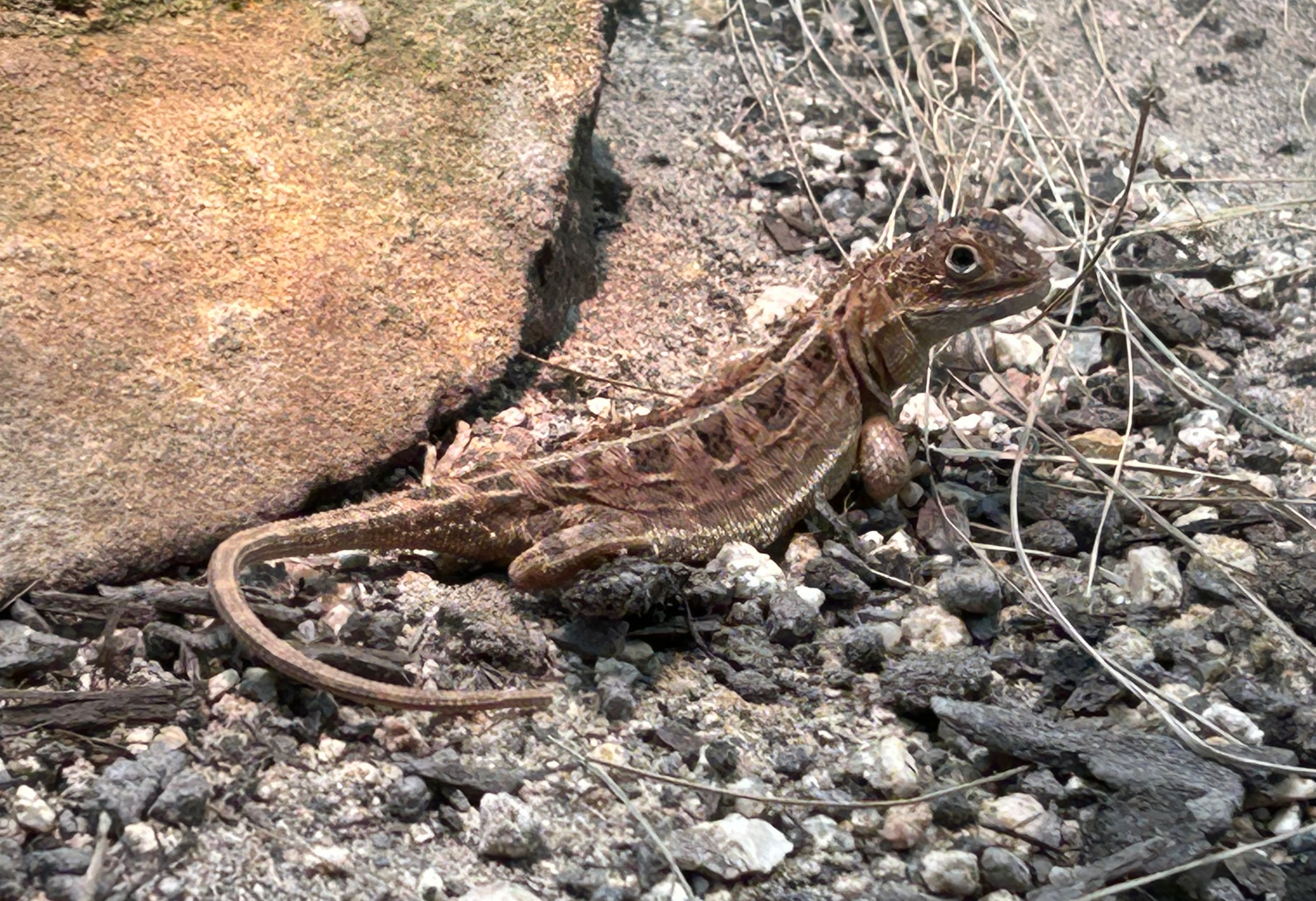

Conservation status
- Critically endangered (EPBC Act)

Scientific classification
- Kingdom: Animalia
- Phylum: Chordata
- Class: Reptilia
- Order: Squamata
- Suborder: Iguania
- Family: Agamidae
- Genus: Tympanocryptis
- Species: T. lineata

Binomial name
- Tympanocryptis lineata Peters, 1863

= Tympanocryptis lineata =

Species of lizard

Tympanocryptis lineata, the Canberra grassland earless dragon or lined earless dragon, is a species of agama found in Australia.

== Description ==
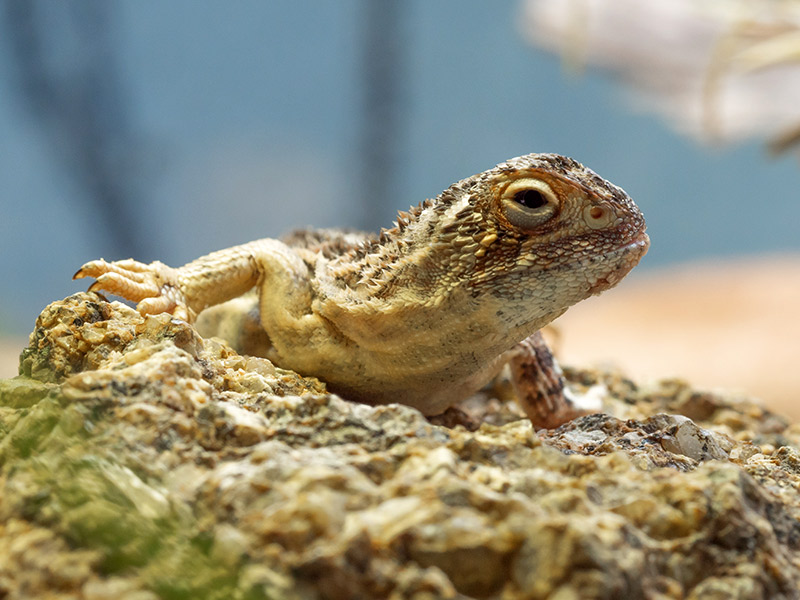
Tympanocryptis lineata

The Canberra grassland earless dragon is a small, light brown to grey brown lizard usually less than 150 millimetres long and weighing 5–9 grams. The species has a tapering snout, six or seven dark brown bands on its back, dark speckling on its front (especially the throat), and eleven or fewer dark blotches on its tail. Some variation in the appearance of individuals in this species is known. For example, spiny scales on the back, and pigmentation of speckles on the front may vary between individuals. Individuals may exhibit orange-pink colouration on their throat, flanks and sides of head, particularly during the breeding season.

== Taxonomy ==
Tympanocryptis lineata refers to a species of grassland earless dragon found only in a small area of the Australian Capital Territory and New South Wales. The species was previously grouped with other species including Tympanocryptis pinguicolla and what is now described as Tympanocryptis petersi.

Historically, 'Tympanocryptis lineata' formed a species complex. Taxonomic research has led to several species or sub-species previously included under 'Tympanocryptis lineata' now being reclassified or described as new species, including:

- Tympanocryptis argillosa
- Tympanocryptis centralis
- Tympanocryptis fictilis
- Tympanocryptis houstoni
- Tympanocryptis lineata
- Tympanocryptis macra
- Tympanocryptis osbornei
- Tympanocryptis petersi
- Tympanocryptis pinguicolla
- Tympanocryptis rustica
- Tympanocryptis tolleyi

Morphologically, the homogeneity of scales on the thighs of the Canberra grassland earless dragon is one characteristic that may differentiate this species from other similar species. However, external morphological characteristics are often inadequate in identifying to species level. Recent taxonomic reclassification has come about through the use of modern techniques including phylogeography and phylogenomics.

== Distribution ==
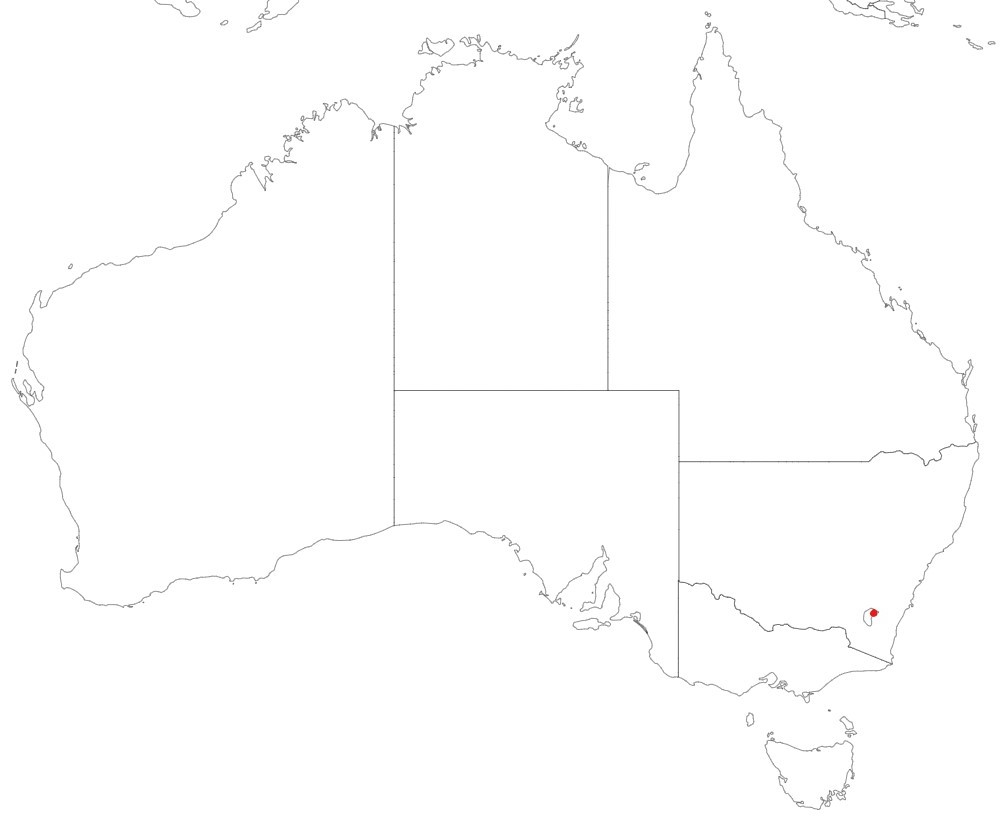
Geographical distribution for Tympanocryptis lineata

The Canberra grassland earless dragon has a very narrow distribution, being found only in a small area of the Australian Capital Territory and New South Wales. Populations have been detected at locations within 13 kilometres of Canberra Airport. Its geographical distribution does not overlap with any other earless dragon species, and as such the Canberra grassland earless dragon is considered to be geographically isolated.

== Ecology and habitat ==
Canberra grassland earless dragons inhabit temperate grasslands characterised by tussocks with open space, few or no trees and shrubs and minimal pasture. They prefer well-drained sites dominated by tall speargrass (genus Austrostipa) and shorter wallaby grass (genus Austrodanthonia). They eat a range of invertebrates including ants, beetles, spiders, moths and moth larvae. The species is thought to utilise existing arthropod burrows for shelter in order to endure extreme temperatures experienced in its habitat.

== Reproduction and longevity ==
Females usually produce only one clutch of between three and seven eggs (most commonly around four eggs). Clutches are produced in spring, with a second clutch produced in summer if conditions are favourable.

Canberra grassland earless dragons can live several years in captivity but are generally short-lived in the wild.

== Threats and conservation ==
The Canberra grassland earless dragon is at high risk of extinction. Population size was declining gradually and more recently a dramatic decline in population size has been observed, and the species has become undetectable in some places. A low annual survival rate for juvenile and adult individuals may contribute to the decline of this species.

Key threats to this species include a reduction in grassland areas due to urban and other development, habitat fragmentation, predation, altered grazing regimes, altered fire regimes, weed invasion and climate change.

The Canberra grassland earless dragon is not listed as a threatened species in the Australian Capital Territory, New South Wales, Australia or the IUCN Red List. However, the Victorian grassland earless dragon (which was previously grouped with the Canberra grassland earless dragon) is listed as endangered. The apparent omission of the Canberra grassland earless dragon on threatened species lists is considered to be an administrative issue due to the recent taxonomic reclassification of this species.

Current conservation and rehabilitation efforts in the Australian Capital Territory are aimed at earless dragon species including the Canberra grassland earless dragon. A captive breeding facility for Canberra grassland earless dragons opened at Tidbinbilla Nature Reserve in 2021. The facility aims to maintain a captive breeding population of genetically diverse individuals for observation and eventual release. Other conservation efforts include habitat restoration and climate risk assessments to understand the viability of future habitats and release sites.
