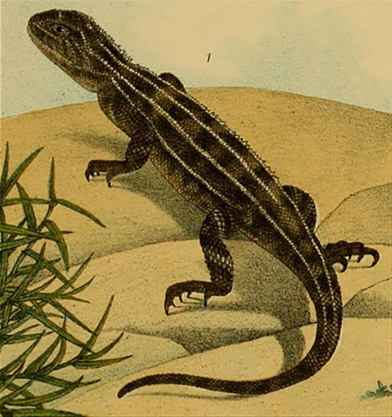

Conservation status
- Critically Endangered (IUCN 3.1)

Scientific classification
- Kingdom: Animalia
- Phylum: Chordata
- Class: Reptilia
- Order: Squamata
- Suborder: Iguania
- Family: Agamidae
- Genus: Tympanocryptis
- Species: T. pinguicolla

Binomial name
- Tympanocryptis pinguicolla Mitchell, 1948

= Tympanocryptis pinguicolla =

Species of lizard

Tympanocryptis pinguicolla, also known as Victorian grassland earless dragon, is a critically endangered species of lizard in the family Agamidae. It is one of a documented species of a relatively small dragon belonging to the genus Tympanocryptis.

== Taxonomy ==
Numerous other species of Tympanocryptis across Australia were formerly classified under T. pinguicolla, but all of these have ultimately been split due to scientific studies finding them to be distinct species. Two populations from the Darling Downs were found in a 2014 study to actually be two new, distinct species, T. condaminensis and T. wilsoni. A 2019 study found a population near Canberra to actually represent an isolated eastern population of T. lineata, while two populations near Cooma and Bathurst respectively represented two new species, T. osbornei and T. mccartneyi. This has left the Victorian population to be the only representative member of the species.

== Description ==
The species lacks an external ear opening and functional eardrum, hence its description as "earless". Adults are about 15 centimetres (5.9 in) in length. The body is covered in large, spiky scales. The animal seeks cover in small holes or beneath rocks, and the diet consists of invertebrates.

== Distribution ==
T. pinguicolla is endemic to the state of Victoria in southeastern Australia. As with the other grassland earless dragons, it is restricted to areas of temperate grassland with tussock and smaller grasses. Very little of this habitat remains in Victoria due to the heavy degradation and conversion of this habitat in the past, which has contributed to the species' endangerment and assumed extinction.

== Threats and conservation ==
Before 2023 T. pinguicolla was classified as Endangered on the IUCN Red List, but this was based on the former view that classified the Canberra, Cooma, and Bathurst populations under T. pinguicolla. A 2019 study suggested that T. pinguicolla may have become extinct, due to the destruction of most of its habitat and the last sighting of the species being made in 1969 in the area of Geelong; this would have made it the first known reptilian extinction on the Australian mainland in modern times. Intensive land use and conversion of the basalt grasslands surrounding the highly populated city of Melbourne were seen as the main contributors to the species' decline.

Hope nonetheless remained that the species was still extant, on the basis of unconfirmed sightings during surveys from 1988–1990. Though later searches found nothing, not all of the remaining grasslands in the area were intensively surveyed and the species is small and hard to detect. The conservation organization Zoos Victoria was involved in conducting the surveys.

In January 2023, ecologists Emi Arnold and Pat Monarca rediscovered an individual. They took photos and videos and informed the Melbourne Zoo.

In June 2023, the rediscovery of the Victorian species was announced, confirming its continued existence after several months of fieldwork managed to find remaining individuals of the species, which are now subject to a rebreeding programme at Melbourne Zoo. The breeding programme, which comprises 16 male and 13 female wild-recovered individuals, has been established at Melbourne Zoo. The programme has announced the successful breeding of the programme's first Tympanocryptis pinguicolla offspring by the end of 2023.

Colossal Biosciences and Zoos Victoria began a conservation project in October 2023 to preserve the species as well as sequence its genome.
