= Alice Springs Desert Park =

- Alice Springs Desert Park logo

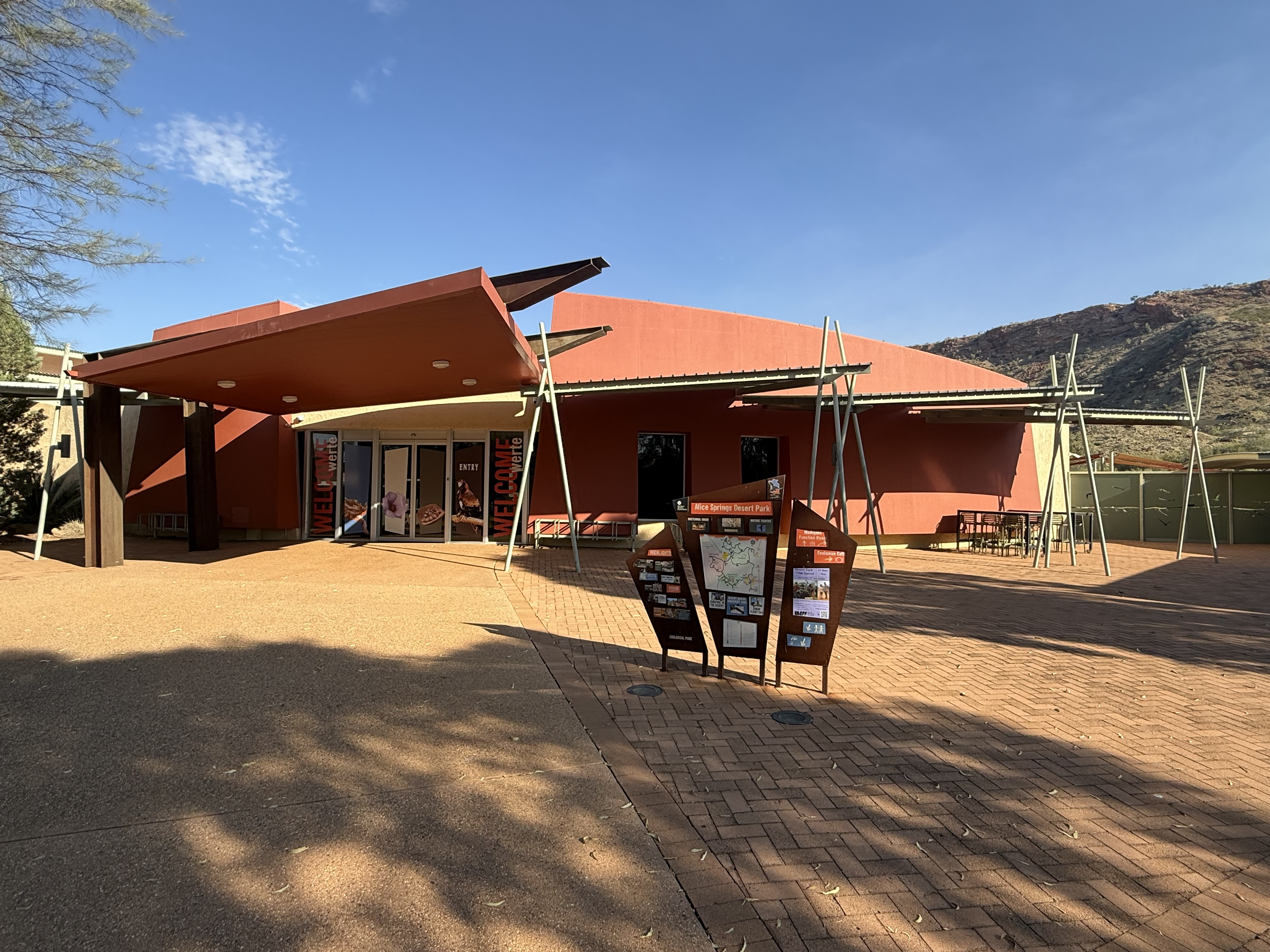
- Alice Springs Desert Park, October 2025
- Interactive map of Alice Springs Desert Park
- 23.7065°S 133.8325°E
- Date opened: March 1997
- Location: Alice Springs, Northern Territory, Australia
- Land area: 1,300 hectares (3,212 acres)
- No. of species: 120
- Annual visitors: 68,300 (2017)
- Memberships: Zoo and Aquarium Association, Botanic Gardens Conservation International
- Major exhibits: Desert Rivers, Sand Country, Nocturnal House, Woodland
- Owner: Parks and Wildlife Commission of the Northern Territory
- Website: alicespringsdesertpark.com.au

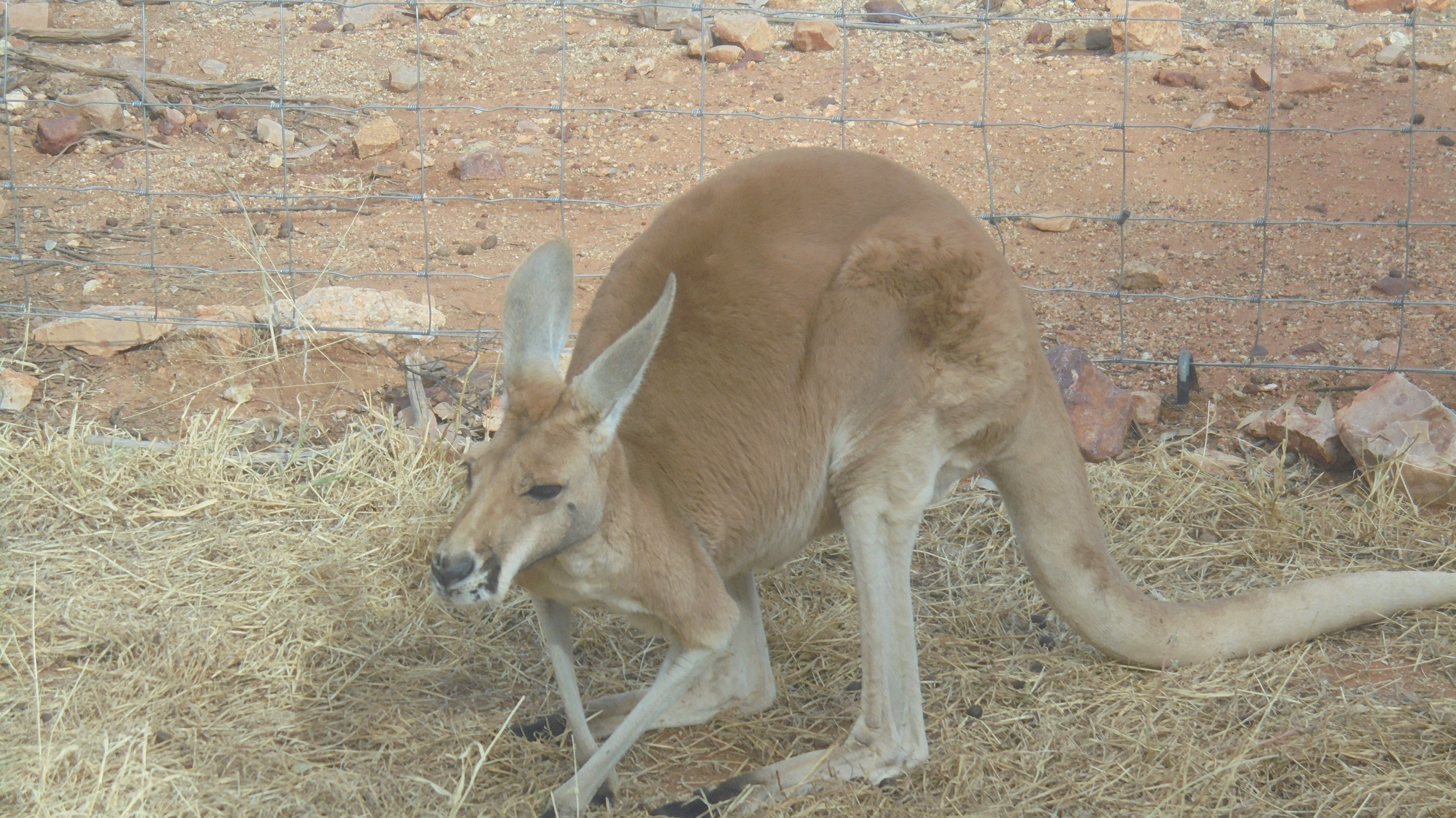
Kangaroo

The Alice Springs Desert Park is an environmental education facility and wildlife park in Alice Springs in the Northern Territory of Australia.

It is sited on 1,300 hectares (3,212 acres), with a core area of 52 hectares (128 acres). It is an institutional member of the Zoo and Aquarium Association and Botanic Gardens Conservation International.

The park contains native animals and plants representative of Central Australian desert environments, and contributes to their conservation through research programs as well as through public education. It offers people the opportunity to experience the variety of the deserts of central Australia, exploring the relationships between the plants, animals and people.

The area is culturally important to the local Arrernte people. Much of the work of the park is under the auspices of their decision-makers and caretakers – people once known as the park's traditional owners.

== Exhibits and facilities ==
The park contains three separate walk-through desert habitat areas accessed through a 1.6-kilometre (1 mi) trail: Desert Rivers, Sand Country, and Woodland. In addition, it has a Nocturnal House and a nature theatre. The entrance area includes an exhibition centre, rest rooms, and café.

Desert Rivers

In this habitat, visitors walk through dry river beds, and areas that have been flooded, and past swamps and water holes. The plants here include river red gums, coolibah trees, aquatic plants, and reeds. Animals in this habitat include finches, cockatoos, water birds, frogs, and fish. Demonstrations here show how the Aboriginal people use this habitat to harvest food and medicine.

Sand Country

This exhibit is a re-creation of the sandy desert including clay, gypsum, and salt pans.

Nocturnal house

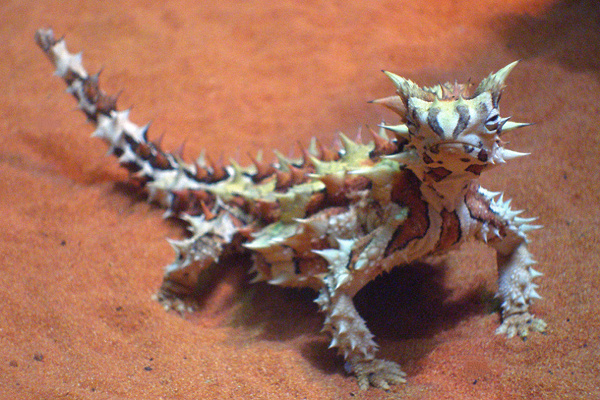
Thorny dragon, also known as thorny devil (Moloch horridus)

The Nocturnal House is located between the Sand Country and Woodland habitats, and is home to many Central Australian reptiles, invertebrates, birds, and mammals that are active during the night. The collection includes some reptiles that may be active during the day but difficult to find in the desert.

Woodland

The Woodland habitat includes enclosures for kangaroos and emus. Visitors can walk among the kangaroos in their exhibit area.

Nature Theatre

Presentations at the Nature Theatre show visitors some of the animals that might be seen while walking through the park, including demonstrations with free-flying birds of prey.

Aboriginal Survival

Presentations at the park, include information on Aboriginal survival one focusing on water gathering and another on food gathering. The food gathering presentation is particularly focused on the Arrernte people and includes information on sex roles, with the distinct jobs of men and women. Information on kinship focuses on Arrernte skin names and the rules for relationships built around the skin name groupings.

== Animals ==
Birds

- Australian boobook
- Australian magpie
- Australian reed-warbler
- Banded lapwing
- Black kite
- Black-breasted buzzard
- Black-faced cuckoo-shrike
- Black-faced woodswallow
- Bourke's parrot
- Budgerigar
- Bush stone-curlew
- Chestnut-eared finch
- Chestnut-rumped thornbill
- Chiming wedgebill
- Cinnamon quail-thrush
- Crested bellbird
- Crimson chat
- Diamond dove
- Dusky grasswren
- Eastern barn owl
- Emu
- Eyrean grasswren
- Golden-backed honeyeater
- Grey teal
- Grey-headed honeyeater
- Hooded robin
- Inland dotterel
- Inland thornbill
- Little buttonquail
- Little grebe
- Masked woodswallow
- Mulga parrot
- Orange chat
- Painted finch
- Peaceful dove
- Pied honeyeater
- Pied stilt
- Plains turkey
- Princess parrot
- Red-capped robin
- Red-tailed black cockatoo
- Rufous whistler
- Rufous-crowned emu-wren
- Sacred kingfisher
- Southern whiteface
- Spinifex pigeon
- Splendid fairy-wren
- Tawny frogmouth
- Wedge-tailed eagle
- Western bowerbird
- Whistling kite
- White-fronted honeyeater
- White-winged fairy-wren
- White-winged triller
- Yellow-rumped thornbill

Fish

- Agassiz's glass fish
- Barred grunter
- Bony bream
- Chequered rainbowfish
- Desert rainbowfish
- Purple-spotted gudgeon
- Tandan catfish

Invertebrates

- Barking spider
- Inland desert scorpion

Mammals

- Bilby
- Brush-tailed mulgara
- Burrowing bettong
- Central rock-rat
- Dingo
- Fat-tailed dunnart
- Ghost bat
- Golden bandicoot
- Greater stick-nest rat
- Mala
- Numbat
- Palyoora
- Red kangaroo
- Red-tailed phascogale
- Short-beaked echidna
- Spinifex hopping-mouse
- Western quoll

Reptiles

- Canegrass dragon
- Centralian rough knob-tailed gecko
- Central military dragon
- Central netted dragon
- Centralian carpet python
- Desert death adder
- Desert skink
- Fire-tailed skink
- Gidgee spiny-tailed skink
- Inland bearded dragon
- Lined earless dragon
- Mulga snake
- Northern spiny-tailed gecko
- Panther skink
- Perentie
- Pygmy mulga monitor
- Slater's skink
- Spinifex legless lizard
- Stimson's banded rock python
- Thorny devil
- Woma python
