= Tympanocryptis mccartneyi =

Conservation status
- Critically Endangered (IUCN 3.1)

- Critically endangered (EPBC Act)

Scientific classification
- Kingdom: Animalia
- Phylum: Chordata
- Class: Reptilia
- Order: Squamata
- Suborder: Iguania
- Family: Agamidae
- Genus: Tympanocryptis
- Species: T. mccartneyi

Binomial name
- Tympanocryptis mccartneyi Melville, Chaplin, Hutchinson, Sumner, Gruber, MacDonald, & Sarre, 2019

Species of lizard

Tympanocryptis mccartneyi, the Bathurst grassland earless dragon, is a species of agama, endemic to New South Wales, Australia.

== Discovery and description ==
Tympanocryptis mccartneyi was described in the same paper as T. osbornei, published in 2019 in the open-access journal Royal Society Open Science, after genetic testing and CT scans of Tympanocryptis specimens showed that they were not T. pinguicolla as previously thought. The paper's first author was Jane Melville. The authors described a new species from the area of Bathurst, New South Wales, with a more precise location concealed due to conservation concerns; the species was named in honour of Ian McCartney, a former Bathurst-area park ranger and naturalist who aided in the species' discovery.

== Distribution ==
Tympanocryptis mccartneyi is an isolated species believed to be found only in the area around Bathurst, and its range does not overlap with any other Tympanocryptis lizards. T. mccartneyi is a specialist inhabitant of grasslands, plains, and paddocks in alluvial plains.

== Conservation ==
All Tympanocryptis species are protected by CITES. Tympanocryptis mccartneyi is recognized as critically endangered by both New South Wales and the national Environment Protection and Biodiversity Conservation Act 1999.
