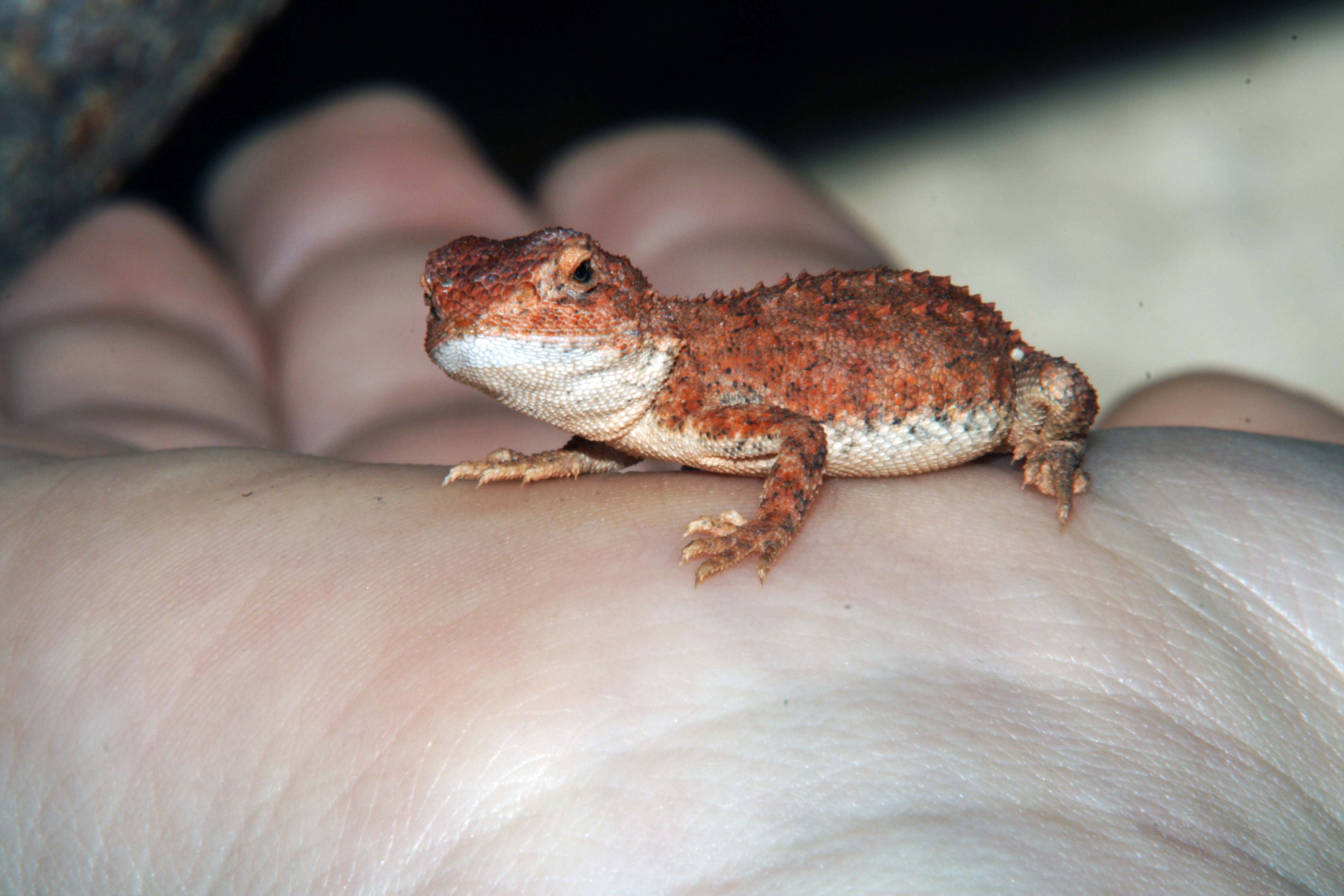
- Tympanocryptis tetraporophora

Scientific classification
- Kingdom: Animalia
- Phylum: Chordata
- Class: Reptilia
- Order: Squamata
- Suborder: Iguania
- Family: Agamidae
- Subfamily: Amphibolurinae
- Genus: Tympanocryptis; W. Peters, 1863

= Tympanocryptis =

Genus of lizards

Tympanocryptis is a genus of Australian lizards in the family Agamidae, commonly known as earless dragons.

== Description ==
The genus Tympanocryptis has the following characters. The tympanum is hidden (hence the common name earless dragon). The body is depressed, and it is covered dorsally with heterogeneous scales. There is no dorsal crest. There is no gular sac, but a strong transverse gular fold is present. The tail is round in cross section. There is a preanal pore on each side, which sometimes is absent in females. In most species there are no femoral pores, Tympanocryptis tetraporophora being an exception.

== Species ==
The following 23 species are recognized as being valid.

- Tympanocryptis argillosa Melville, Chaplin, Hipsley, Sarre, Sumner, & Hutchinson, 2019 – claypan earless dragon
- Tympanocryptis centralis Sternfeld, 1925 – central Australian earless dragon
- Tympanocryptis cephalus Günther, 1867 – blotch-tailed earless dragon
- Tympanocryptis condaminensis Melville et al., 2014 – Condamine earless dragon (previously part of T. pinguicolla)
- Tympanocryptis diabolicus Doughty et al., 2015 – Hamersley pebble-mimic dragon
- Tympanocryptis fictilis Melville, Chaplin, Hipsley, Sarre, Sumner, & Hutchinson, 2019 – Harlequin earless dragon
- Tympanocryptis fortescuensis Doughty et al., 2015 – Fortescue pebble-mimic dragon
- Tympanocryptis gigas F. Mitchell, 1948 – Gascoyne pebble-mimic dragon
- Tympanocryptis houstoni Storr, 1982 – Houston's earless dragon
- Tympanocryptis intima F. Mitchell, 1948 – gibber earless dragon
- Tympanocryptis lineata W. Peters, 1863 – lined earless dragon or Canberra grassland earless dragon (Canberra population previously part of T. pinguicolla)
- Tympanocryptis macra (Storr, 1982) – savannah earless dragon
- Tympanocryptis mccartneyi Melville et al., 2019 – Bathurst grassland earless dragon (previously part of T. pinguicolla)
- Tympanocryptis osbornei Melville et al., 2019 – Monaro grassland earless dragon (previously part of T. pinguicolla)
- Tympanocryptis pentalineata Melville et al., 2014 – five-lined earless dragon
- Tympanocryptis petersi Melville, Chaplin, Hipsley, Sarre, Sumner, & Hutchinson, 2019 – lined earless dragon
- Tympanocryptis pinguicolla F. Mitchell, 1948 – Victorian grassland earless dragon
- Tympanocryptis pseudopsephos Doughty et al., 2015 – Goldfields pebble-mimic dragon
- Tympanocryptis rustica Melville, Chaplin, Hipsley, Sarre, Sumner, & Hutchinson, 2019 – Tennant Creek pebble dragon
- Tympanocryptis tetraporophora Lucas & C. Frost, 1895 – long-tailed earless dragon
- Tympanocryptis tolleyi Melville, Chaplin, Hipsley, Sarre, Sumner, & Hutchinson, 2019 – Gawler earless dragon
- Tympanocryptis uniformis F. Mitchell, 1948 – even-scaled earless dragon
- Tympanocryptis wilsoni Melville et al., 2014 – Roma earless dragon (previously part of T. pinguicolla)

== The "grassland earless dragons" ==
Several members of the T. lineata species complex (namely the Canberra population of T. lineata, T. mccartneyi, T. osbornei, and T. pinguicolla) are referred to as the "grassland earless dragons", being the only members of the family Agamidae to be restricted to natural temperate grasslands. These species are found at higher altitudes and in regions that have cooler temperatures than any other earless dragon, where they prefer sites with both taller tussock and shorter grasses. The species were formerly considered different isolated populations of T. pinguicolla, until a 2019 study found the Canberra population to actually be an isolated eastern population of T. lineata and the Cooma and Bathurst populations to represent distinct species, and thus restricted the definition of T. pinguicolla to refer to only the possibly-extinct Victorian population.

The grassland earless dragons lay 3-6 eggs in late spring or early summer. Their young hatch in late summer (possibly disperse soon after hatching), grow to adult size rapidly (by late autumn-early winter), mate the following spring, and often die within one year of birth. They can reach the age of 5 within captivity.

All of the grassland earless dragons are highly endangered due to the heavy destruction and conversion of the temperate grasslands, of which less than 1% are said to remain. Overgrazing poses one of the most significant threats to them, especially when rocks are disturbed. These species are rarely found outside native temperate grasslands, and does not adapt well to changed environments, primarily due to the lack of food diversity found outside their native habitat. T. pinguicolla may already be extinct due to the heavy degradation that grasslands have received in Victoria, with the last known confirmed sighting being made in 1969.

According to herpetologist Lyn S. Nelson, "Observations indicate that arthropod burrows, surface rocks, or other similar refuge sites may be necessary for the continued persistence of populations of dragons, by providing thermal refugia." They are known to hide within abandoned arthropod burrows and underneath rocky outcrops in order to lay eggs and protect themselves from predators. Soil disturbance, such as ploughing or compaction, might also result in destruction of the essential arthropod burrows and possibly a reduction in the abundance, at least in the short-term, of burrow forming arthropods. A radio-tracking study found that "burrows excavated by arthropods are an important resource for grassland earless dragons, with individuals having one or two home burrows around which they maintained home ranges of between 925 m^{2} and 4768 m^{2}." According to Nelson, they "[m]ay survive short-term disturbance from fire."

In early January 2014, media reported that researchers Professor Stephen Sarre and Dr Lisa Doucette from the University of Canberra's Institute for Applied Ecology had succeeded in breeding the Canberran T. lineata in captivity, and had also hatched eggs gathered from field studies, with around 60 hatchlings being born. In June 2011, Professor Sarre's team won a four-year funding grant from the Australian Research Council to research and potentially save the species from extinction, and find a cause for the species recent collapse in numbers, thought to be associated with 10 years of drought in the species' range. In 2019, ecologist Brett Howard from the ACT Parks and Conservation Service said that "grassland earless dragons are at risk of extinction in the near future even though much has been done to improve their survival chances in the past five years." He then listed the threats posed to this species, saying "this species has suffered declines in recent decades likely due to a combination of drought, overgrazing and climate change."
