= Tympanocryptis pseudopsephos =

Conservation status
- Least Concern (IUCN 3.1)

Scientific classification
- Kingdom: Animalia
- Phylum: Chordata
- Class: Reptilia
- Order: Squamata
- Suborder: Iguania
- Family: Agamidae
- Genus: Tympanocryptis
- Species: T. pseudopsephos

Binomial name
- Tympanocryptis pseudopsephos Doughty, Kealley, Shoo, & Melville, 2015

Species of lizard

Tympanocryptis pseudopsephos, the Goldfields pebble-mimic dragon, is a species of agama found in the Goldfields region of Western Australia.
