= Tympanocryptis uniformis =

Conservation status
- Data Deficient (IUCN 3.1)

Scientific classification
- Kingdom: Animalia
- Phylum: Chordata
- Class: Reptilia
- Order: Squamata
- Suborder: Iguania
- Family: Agamidae
- Genus: Tympanocryptis
- Species: T. uniformis

Binomial name
- Tympanocryptis uniformis Mitchell, 1948
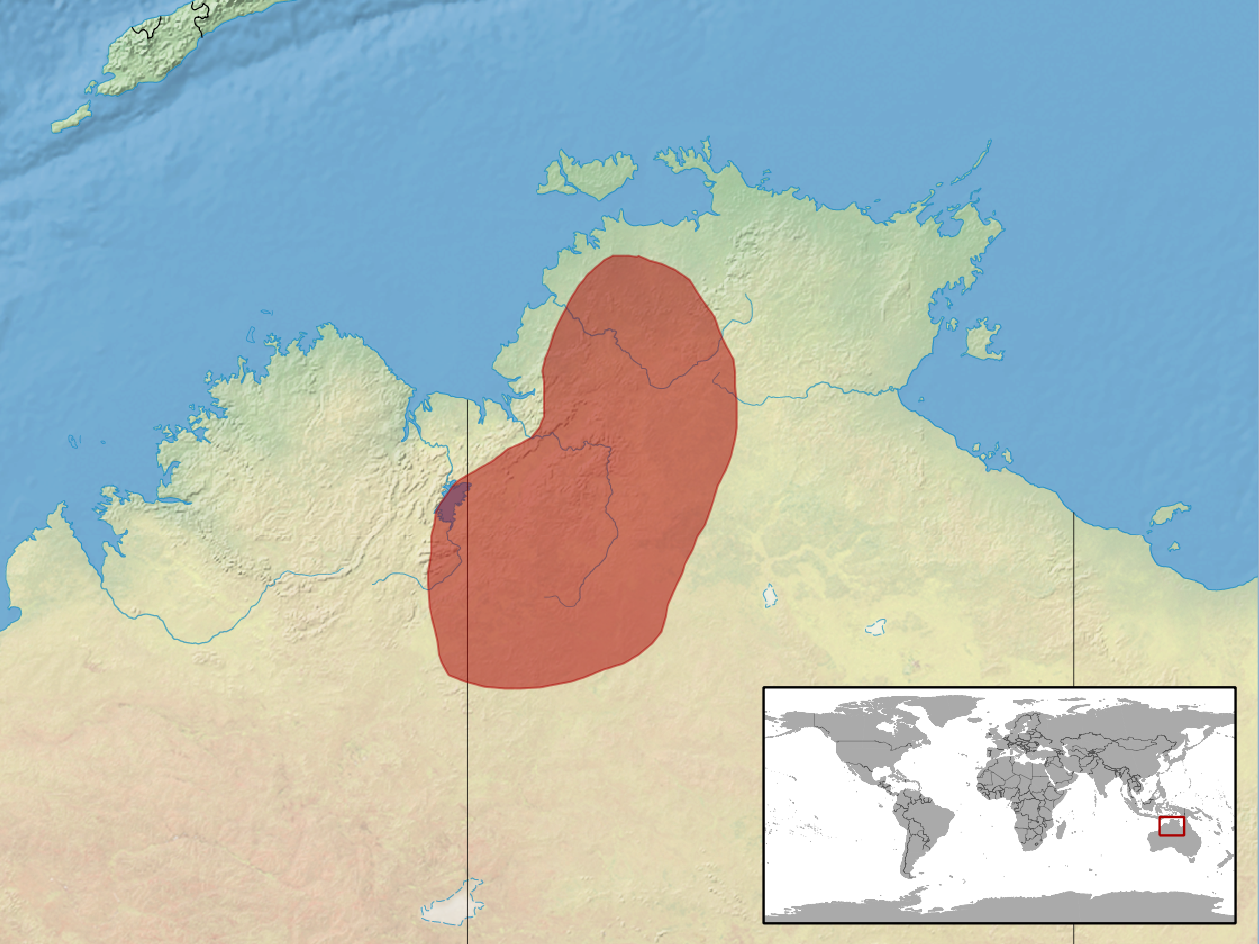

Species of lizard

Tympanocryptis uniformis, the even-scaled earless dragon, is a species of agama found in Western Australia and the Northern Territory.
