= Tympanocryptis intima =

Gibber earless dragon

Conservation status
- Least Concern (IUCN 3.1)

Scientific classification
- Kingdom: Animalia
- Phylum: Chordata
- Class: Reptilia
- Order: Squamata
- Suborder: Iguania
- Family: Agamidae
- Genus: Tympanocryptis
- Species: T. intima

Binomial name
- Tympanocryptis intima Mitchell, 1948

Species of lizard

The gibber earless dragon (Tympanocryptis intima) also known as the smooth-snouted earless dragon, is a species of agamid lizard endemic to Australia. It is one of a documented species of the genus Tympanocryptis, a group of small terrestrial lizards that feed off invertebrates and are characterised by the absence of an external ear structure.

Tympanocryptis intima, also known as the gibber earless dragon and the smooth snouted dragon, belongs to the family Agamidae and can be distinguished from other genera within the family by a hidden tympanum, lack of dorsal crest and gular sac but has a gular fold. The genus of tympanocryptis includes other documented species, in which one of them is T.intima. This species can be differentiated from other species within the genus by the tubercles as they are enlarged, sparse, are wider than the length and tend to form four longitudinal lines.

== Taxonomy ==
The genus Tympanocryptis was first described in 1863 by German naturalist Professor Wilhelm Peters. Further major revisions of the genus have occurred since, with the species Tympanocryptis intima being described in 1948 by Francis Mitchell of the South Australian Museum. T. intima, was initially named Tympanocryptis cephalus until 1948 when Francis Mitchell described T. intima as a distinct species.

== Description ==
Adults of this species have an average snout-vent length (SVL) of 50mm, with a total body length of 110mm. Individuals in this species can range in colour from pale yellowish brown to brick red and often present with pale banding across the body and darker banding along the length of the tail. The head is rounded with predominately smooth or slightly rugose scales. Scales on the body less smooth and interspersed with larger spinose scales. The ventral surface is pale-cream to white in colour peppered by dark brown or black spots. This pale ventral side allows for greater thermal-regulation in extreme temperatures. The evolution of the Gibber Earless Dragon has culminated in the development cryptic colouration in order to remain unseen by predators in its natural environment.

The colouration of T. intima ranges form pale yellowish brown to brick red with the colour changing depending on the locality. Pale grey-brown to bright pale back lateral stripes generally occur either side of the mid-line with darker brown blotches of four on either side of the midline. Twelve darker bands along the tail occur with a pale colouration in between the darker areas. A greyish bar occurs on the back of the nape. The underside of T. intima is white and sometimes has fine brown spots on the throat and chest of male species. The total length is 123mm, with a body length of 41mm. The head is round in shape with smooth or slightly rugose scales and is longer (16mm) than the width (13mm). The nostril is oval with an enlarged nasal, directed forward and downward in between the eye and the tip of the snout. The nose is separated from the labials by 4-6 scales. The head scales or superlabials contain 12-16 scales and are smooth or slightly rugose. The neck is narrower than the head, with a depressed body that is covered with smooth, small, slightly overlapping scales. Intermixed within the scale arrangement are enlarged spikey tubercules in which generally align in four longitudinal rows and are wider than they are long with rounded front edges. The throat or gular scales as well as the ventral or underside scales are smooth. The limbs and tail lengths are short with the tail recorded as 66mm in length, fore limbs 25 mm and hind limb 38 mm. The hind limb is adpressed to the shoulder with side-ward scales and enlarged sharply pointed tubercles. 18 and 10 spiny, divided into two points, the lamella occur under the fourth and third toes. Preanal pores are present and usually only occur in males with a single preanal pore on each side.

== Distribution and habitat ==
This species is known to inhabit parts of the Eyrean Basin, an inland drainage basin covering an area of 1,200,000 square kilometres. The distribution area of the Gibber Earless Dragon is within the arid interior region of north-eastern South Australia and the adjoining states of New South Wales and Queensland and the Northern Territory. Within this region, it inhabits the open gibber deserts and spinifex flats. The Gibber Earless Dragon will stay close to their burrow system, perching itself on a rock or structure nearby, being able to quickly retreat when sensing danger.

== Distribution ==
T. intima is endemic to Australia and is distributed across central North Western South Australia, south eastern Northern Territory, western Queensland and a small area in north western New South Wales.

== Ecology and habitat ==
T. intima inhabits areas of high temperatures and can be found basking in direct sunlight with temperatures reaching up to 43 degrees Celsius. Throughout summer, when conditions are warmest and being a ectotherm, the dragon is active during the day and can be found basking with the hind legs propped, pushing their body in a vertical position to expose the underside to the sun. Due to the undersides being white, some heat will be deflected away and can maintain a core body temperature under the surrounding ambient conditions. The dragon alters its behavior and physiology to the high temperature and arid conditions (Wilson). Most other Tympanocryptis species will retreat to burrows or shade when temperatures reach 43 degrees, however T.intima has an extremely high tolerance to temperature. Favourable habitat for T. intima is shrublands with stony gibber substrate and sparse vegetation and open gibber deserts and spinifex flats of the Eyrean Basin. The species is restricted to rocky subhabitats with a high preference to gibber stone substrates. This is usually due to the species being able to use its colouration to blend into the surroundings to avoid predation. T. intima presses its body into the substrate and curls the tail to mimic a gibber stone and reduce its shadow. This strategy acts as a camouflage technique. Other species tend to flee for cover or use burrows as escape mechanisms, however the T. intima uses this camouflage technique instead. Some lizards are burrowing however, due to T.intima depressed body it is more likely a crevice-dweller. T. intima is an active diurnal terrestrial species.

== Reproduction ==
Females of this species lay a mean of approximately eight eggs per clutch.

== Diet and reproduction ==
T. intima is a predator that feeds primarily on insects and other small terrestrial invertebrate. However, lizards alter their diets with maturity, seasonal changes and food availability. T. intima species are oviparious. As there are both male and females in this species, copulation occurs and fertilisation is internal. One of two hemipenes from the male penetrates the females reproductive tract and fertilization of one or more eggs occur within the females oviducts. T. intima has potential to achieve 1-14 eggs per clutch. The clutch size is potentially dependent on the size of the female. Factors such as temperature, rainfall, humidity, and food availability can affect the timing of reproduction.

== Etymology ==
The genus name Tympanocryptis refers to the features of the species while the species name is related to the distribution. The etymology of the name is listed below.

Tympano – From the word tympanum. Zoology: The tympanic membrane or eardrum

Cryptis – From the word cryptic. Zoology: (of coloration or markings) serving to camouflage an animal in its natural environment.

Intima – 'innermost', referring to the inland distribution.
