= Lined earless dragon =

There are two species of agama named lined earless dragon:

- Tympanocryptis lineata
- Tympanocryptis petersi
