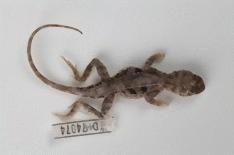

Conservation status
- Data Deficient (IUCN 3.1)

Scientific classification
- Kingdom: Animalia
- Phylum: Chordata
- Class: Reptilia
- Order: Squamata
- Suborder: Iguania
- Family: Agamidae
- Genus: Tympanocryptis
- Species: T. pentalineata

Binomial name
- Tympanocryptis pentalineata Melville, Smith, Hobson, Hunjan & Shoo, 2014

= Tympanocryptis pentalineata =

Species of lizard

Tympanocryptis pentalineata, also known as five-lined earless dragon, is one of a documented species of a relatively small dragon belonging to the genus Tympanocryptis. It is a medium-sized Tympanocryptis with an average length is 5–6 cm (2.0–2.4 in) from snout-to-vent. It has a distinct dorsal body pattern, consisting of five longitudinal narrow grey or white stripes on a brown-black patterned background. It is only known from one location, 50 km south-west of Normanton in the gulf region of far northern Queensland. It inhabits flat flood-plains covered by grasses and low perennial shrubs.

== Taxonomy ==
The species is named for its dorsal colour pattern, characterised by five longitudinal white stripes extending along the body: one vertebral, two dorso-lateral, and two lateral.

== Description ==
Tympanocryptis pentalineata is a medium-sized Tympanocryptis with an average length is 5–6 cm (2.0–2.4 in) from snout-to-vent. It has a distinct dorsal body pattern, consisting of five longitudinal narrow grey or white stripes on a brown-black patterned background. The five stripes consist of: one weak, narrow, grey vertebral stripe; two white, narrow dorso-lateral stripes; and two narrow, white lateral stripes. When examined closely the lateral stripes consist of a single row of enlarged, mucronate white scales extending from axilla to groin, bordered ventrally and dorsally with smaller, darker scales.

Strong background patterning is evident between the dorso-lateral and lateral stripes, consisting of three broad transverse bands that are dark-brow to black. Scattered through the darker background colouring are enlarged white mucronate scales, giving the impression of white flecks on a dark background. The dorso-lateral stripes continue onto the tail to about 1/3rd of its length. There is a cluster of 3–5 enlarged, pale mucronate scales at the anterior extent of the paravertebral stripes, sitting at the rear of the head. On the ventral surface, the throat and upper chest area is faintly pigmented with black flecks or pigmentation is absent. The nare slightly off-centre towards the posterior-dorsal section of the nasal scale. There are two pre-anal pores and two femoral pores.

== Distribution and habitat ==
Tympanocryptis pentalineata is only known from one location, 50 km south-west of Normanton in the gulf region of far northern Queensland. It inhabits flat flood-plains covered by grasses and low perennial shrubs.
