= Tympanocryptis gigas =

Conservation status
- Least Concern (IUCN 3.1)

Scientific classification
- Kingdom: Animalia
- Phylum: Chordata
- Class: Reptilia
- Order: Squamata
- Suborder: Iguania
- Family: Agamidae
- Genus: Tympanocryptis
- Species: T. gigas

Binomial name
- Tympanocryptis gigas Mitchell, 1948

Species of lizard

Tympanocryptis gigas, the Gascoyne pebble-mimic dragon, is a species of agama found in Australia.
