= Tympanocryptis diabolicus =

Conservation status
- Least Concern (IUCN 3.1)

Scientific classification
- Kingdom: Animalia
- Phylum: Chordata
- Class: Reptilia
- Order: Squamata
- Suborder: Iguania
- Family: Agamidae
- Genus: Tympanocryptis
- Species: T. diabolicus

Binomial name
- Tympanocryptis diabolicus Doughty, Kealley, Shoo, & Melville, 2015

Species of lizard

Tympanocryptis diabolicus, the Hamersley pebble-mimic dragon, is a species of agama found in Western Australia.
