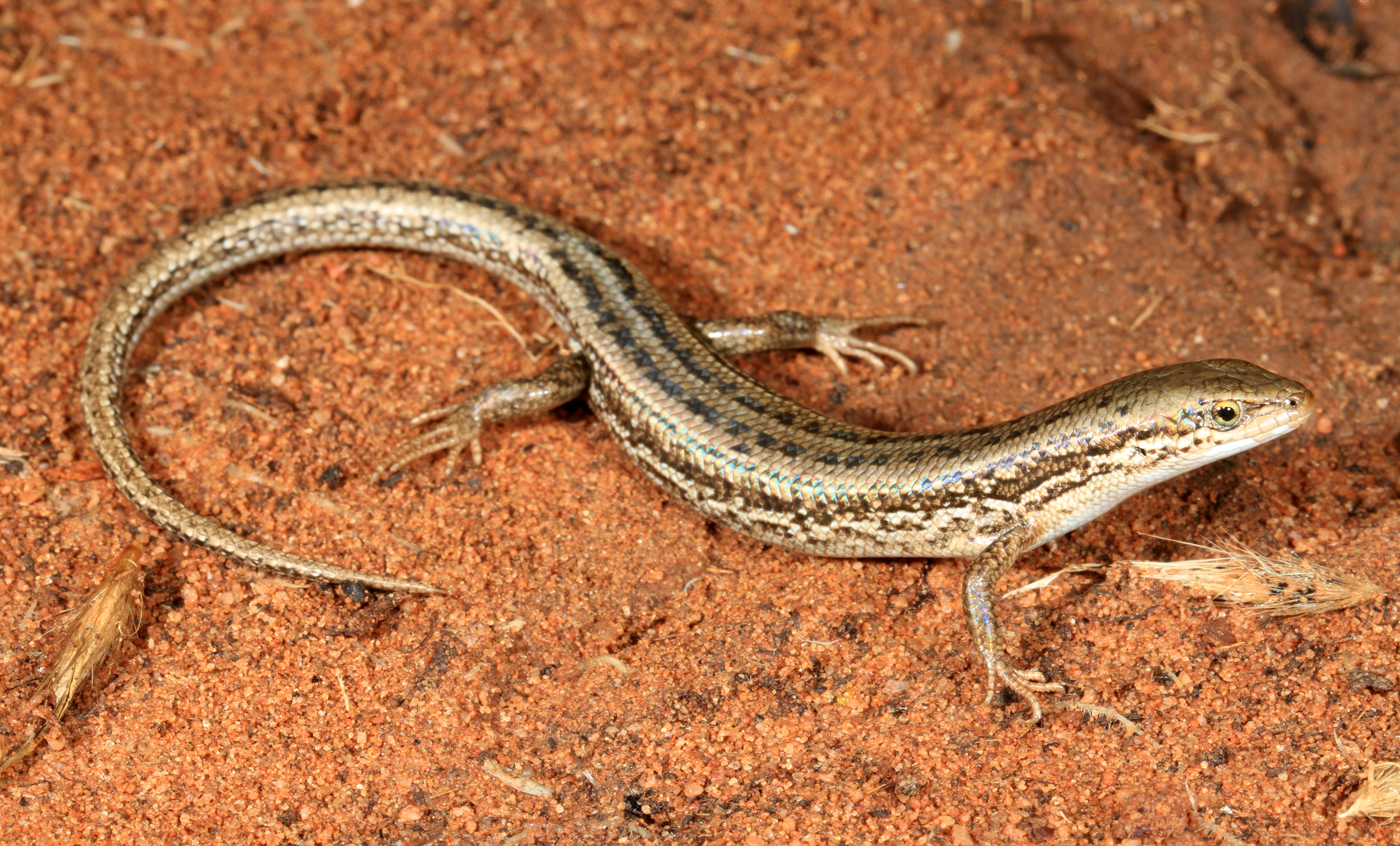

Conservation status
- Least Concern (IUCN 3.1)

Scientific classification
- Kingdom: Animalia
- Phylum: Chordata
- Class: Reptilia
- Order: Squamata
- Family: Scincidae
- Genus: Morethia
- Species: M. adelaidensis

Binomial name
- Morethia adelaidensis (Peters, 1874)

= Morethia adelaidensis =

Species of lizard

The saltbush Morethia skink (Morethia adelaidensis), or more commonly referred to as saltbush skink, is a species of skink found in Australia. They are part of an 8 species genus of Morethia, which are all endemic to Australia. Akin to other members of the Morethia genus, saltbush skinks feature transparent disks as eye covers and eyelids which are stationary, along with specialised limbs which enable quick traversal of sand dunes. Taxonomically, the species was first classified by German explorer Wilhelm Karl Hartwig in 1871.

== Distribution ==
Recorded habitat range spans from Lake Eyre Basin, extending into coastal regions of Nullarbor, arid regions of Western Australia and the northern corner border of NSW, Australia. Saltbush Morethia skinks have a preference for arid shrublands, which make up their primary habitat zones. In reference to the species name, Its spatial distribution is primarily linked to the presence of Saltbush chenopod shrubs in these habitat zones. Their distribution is generally shared with other species in the Morethia genus such as Morethia boulengeri, which also have a preference for this habitat type.

Higher abundances are generally observed in areas with observable grass cover, such as temperate native grasslands in South Australia, while non-grassland habitat contains more infrequent populations. Saltbush skinks additionally occupy river gorges and rocky granite outcrops; however, their widespread arid distribution does not limit them to these zones.

== Description ==
Saltbush skinks are small sized skinks, with adult males averaging 5 cm in size based on snout-vent length, with grey, or olive grey complexions. Two primary black bands stretch dorsally and laterally, extending down to the tail. The upper black band is darker, with significant speckled markings. Directly below black bands is a singular interrupted, irregular white band which extends through the ear and above each forelimb.

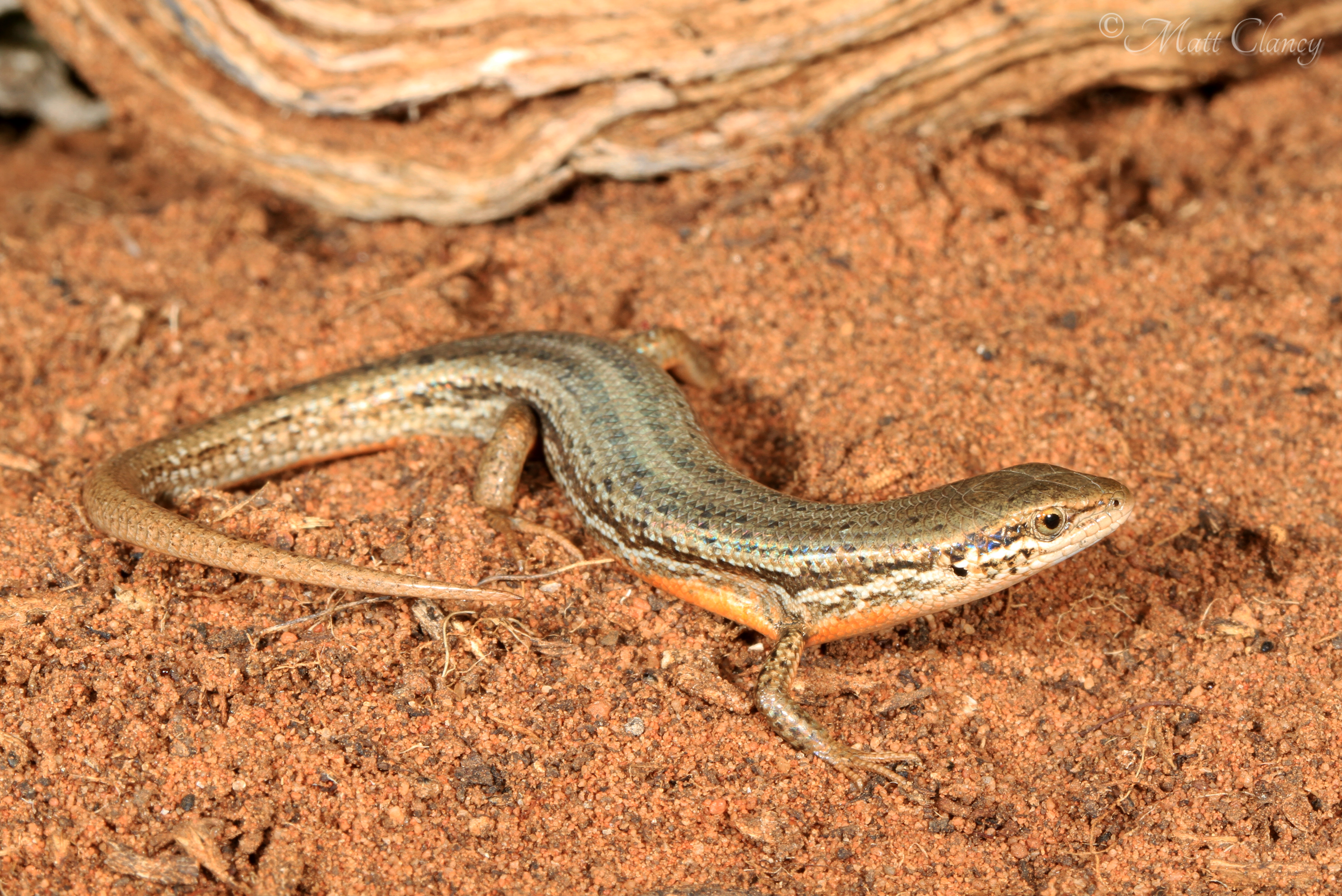
Saltbush skink, pictured with fire-tail markings covering ventral edges

Species examined in Lake Eyre are found to feature paler markings, with lateral black lines less visible compared to species found elsewhere. However, most species exhibit darker markings. Saltbush Morethia skinks feature visibly separated nasal superiors, or supranasals. While its eyes are surrounded by granule-like scale clusters.

== Reproduction ==
Saltbush skinks produce egg clutches and do not produce live offspring, which means that they are oviparous by nature. Clutches generally average around 5 eggs per breeding female, which are usually buried in sandy substrates, or amongst rocky granite outcrops. While egg clutch size is dependent on the size of breeding females. Like other Morethia skinks, breeding males develop orange 'fire-tail' markings, covering all ventral edges, which also extend under the tail and around both hind and forelimbs for territorial purposes. Breeding observations are limited, however anecdotal findings suggest that communal nesting patterns are possible, with numerous breeding females.

== Diet and behaviour ==
Saltbush skinks are insectivorous, akin to other Morethia species. The species is diurnal and is mostly active during the day. Like other reptiles, saltbush skinks require thermal heat for temperature regulation. Saltbush skinks are halophytic and have a high tolerance for saline areas. Like other Morethia taxa, saltbush skinks burrow shallow perturbations in sandy soils, either amongst shrubs or rocky outcrops. This behaviour has been observed in salt flat shrub lands of Lake Eyre Basin, along with saltbush vegetation found in southern Queensland.

== Threats and predators ==
The Union for Conservation of Nature (IUCN) currently lists saltbush skinks as 'Least concern'. Therefore, the species is unabated from general land clearing and grazing.

Akin to other smaller sized skinks of the Morethia genus, saltbush skinks are preyed upon by native snake species of the Elapidae genus. The species has been found in the stomachs of curl snakes (Suta suta.) in Western Australia, along with other medium to large snake species with diets consisting of smaller sized reptiles.
