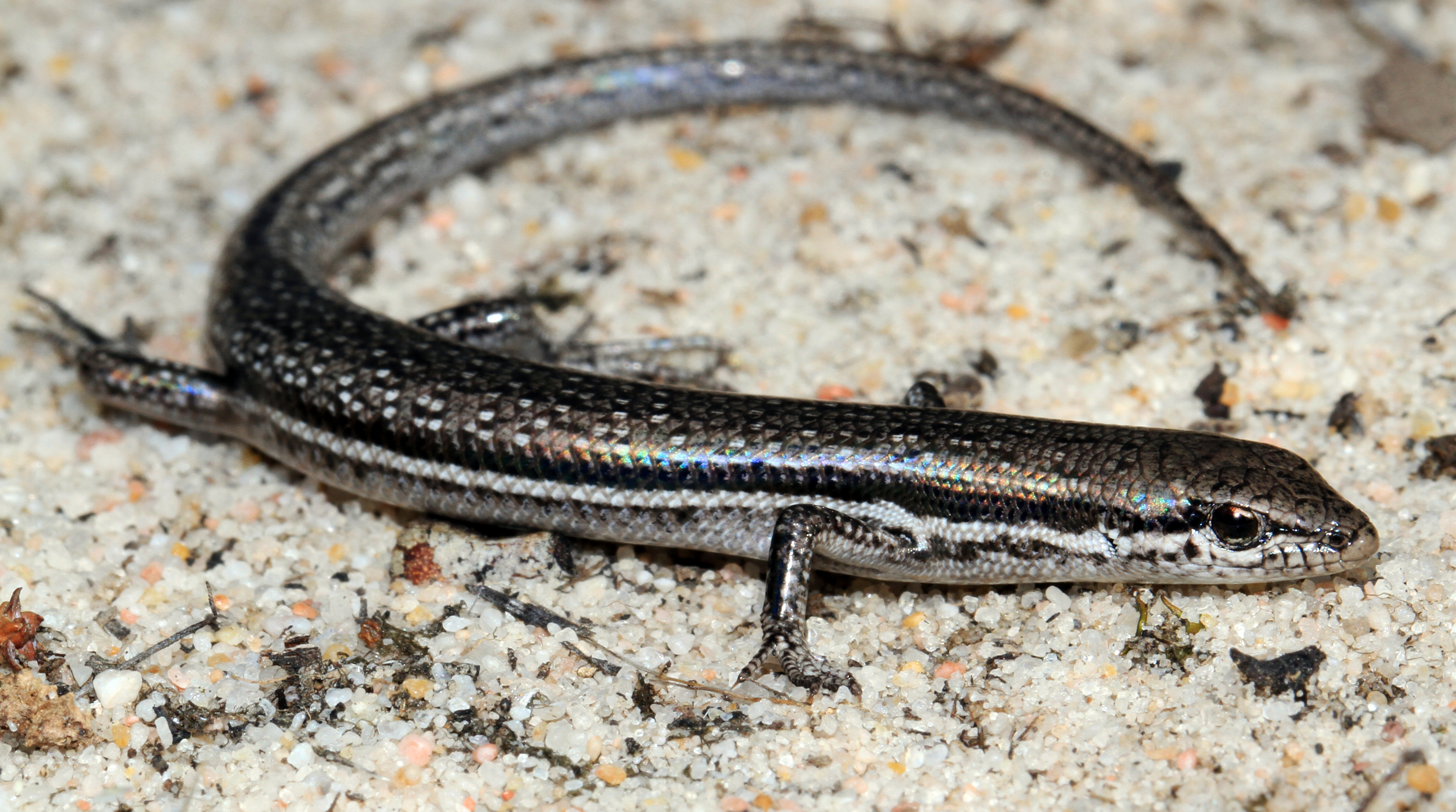

Conservation status
- Least Concern (IUCN 3.1)

Scientific classification
- Kingdom: Animalia
- Phylum: Chordata
- Class: Reptilia
- Order: Squamata
- Suborder: Scinciformata
- Infraorder: Scincomorpha
- Family: Eugongylidae
- Genus: Morethia
- Species: M. obscura

Binomial name
- Morethia obscura Storr, 1972

= Morethia obscura =

Species of lizard

The shrubland Morethia skink (Morethia obscura) is a species of skink endemic to Australia, of the family Scincidae, found in New South Wales, South Australia, Victoria (Australia), Western Australia in Australia.

== History of nomenclature ==
Prior to 1845, this species of skink had been generally recognised as species M. lineoocellatus. In 1845, J.E Gray an eminent British zoologist, distinguished the shrubland Morethia skink from the M. lineoocellatus as it had supranasal scales and renamed it M. anomalus. G.M. Storr described the more commonly known shrubland morethia skink as Morethia obscura in 1972. In 1972, Storr carried out a study and made observations based on research conducted by M. Smyth in the same year. This separated the new species M. obscura from M. lineoocellata using the condition of the supraciliary scales described by Smyth and the presence of supranasal scales as the major diagnostic.

== Description ==
Skinks are small reptiles that belong to the family Scincidae. The family Scinicidae is described as being one of the most diverse lizard families known. Skinks in general have quite small legs not in proportion to their body size and no pronounced neck but are bilaterally symmetrical. The shrubland Morethia skink (M. obscura) is, often mistaken for the ragged snake eyed skink (C. pannosus). M. obscura is a small terrestrial lizard, with an average adult body weight of approximately 1.9 grams, with an olive brown to olive gray dorsal surface. This species sometimes has a pale dorsolateral stripe and a broad irregular black lateral stripe. Adults with intact tails measure approximately 107 mm to 129 mm with a snout vent length of anywhere between 18 mm to 56 mm. The M. obscura has one pair of nuchals, which are two or more plates covering of the dorsal portion of the neck. These skinks have one to four ear openings with a tympanic middle ear system with an inner ear structure called an otolith which detects acceleration and acoustic sounds with a hearing range of up to 40 dB. Scales on the mid body are usually between 26 and 28 rows with lamellae (thin plates) under the fourth toe, which are smooth or keeled and unicarinate.

== Distribution ==
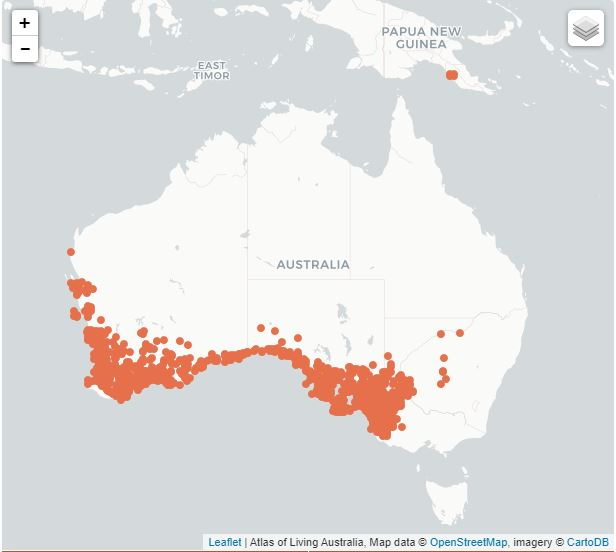
Distribution throughout Australia of Morethia obscura

Shrubland morethia skinks can be found in woodlands, heaths and shrublands, often in association with mallee and spinifex, within arid and semi-arid areas of southwest New South Wales, southern South Australia and some of its offshore islands, northwest Victoria and southern Western Australia. They are abundant in open areas with little vegetation, such as forest edges, so that they can utilise the food resources within a forest, but still reach the ambient light and temperature levels required for a heliothermic species. Studies have found they are less abundant, almost non-existent in heavily vegetated areas. These areas generally have a rainfall of less than 500mm per annum.

== Diet ==
Not much is known about the specific diet of M. obscura though from studies on other species from the same family it can be deduced that they are primarily insectivorous with typical prey including crickets, flies, beetles grasshoppers and the multitude of insects found in vegetative undergrowth of forests.

== Reproduction ==
M. obscura reproduce sexually with dioecious sexual system (distinct female and male organisms) which is a species characteristic, and is an oviparous animal. Generally, clutch size is anywhere from 3 to 5 eggs. Breeding season commences from October to early November with fertilised eggs retained in the female reproductive system until late January each year when the embryo within the laid eggs is in an advanced developed state.

== Threats ==
=== Fire ===
Altered fire regimes may cause a threat to M. obscura as it has been found to be more abundant in areas that have experienced thinning and burning. M. obscura response to fire is still unclear, although it is thought that complete loss following fire is unlikely.

=== Habitat loss ===
As M.obscura is found in abundance around the edges of forest fragments this makes it less susceptible to the loss of habitat via degradation.

=== Predators ===
Foxes, possums, snakes, birds, rodents and larger lizards have been known to prey upon these smaller reptiles.

=== Defence ===
Autotomy gives the skink the ability to regenerate lost tails. M. obscura have a tapering tail that will detach if a predator is within reach, however they are able to regrow their tail within a few months. They have also been known to bury themselves in loose soil to hide when being pursued.

== Gallery ==
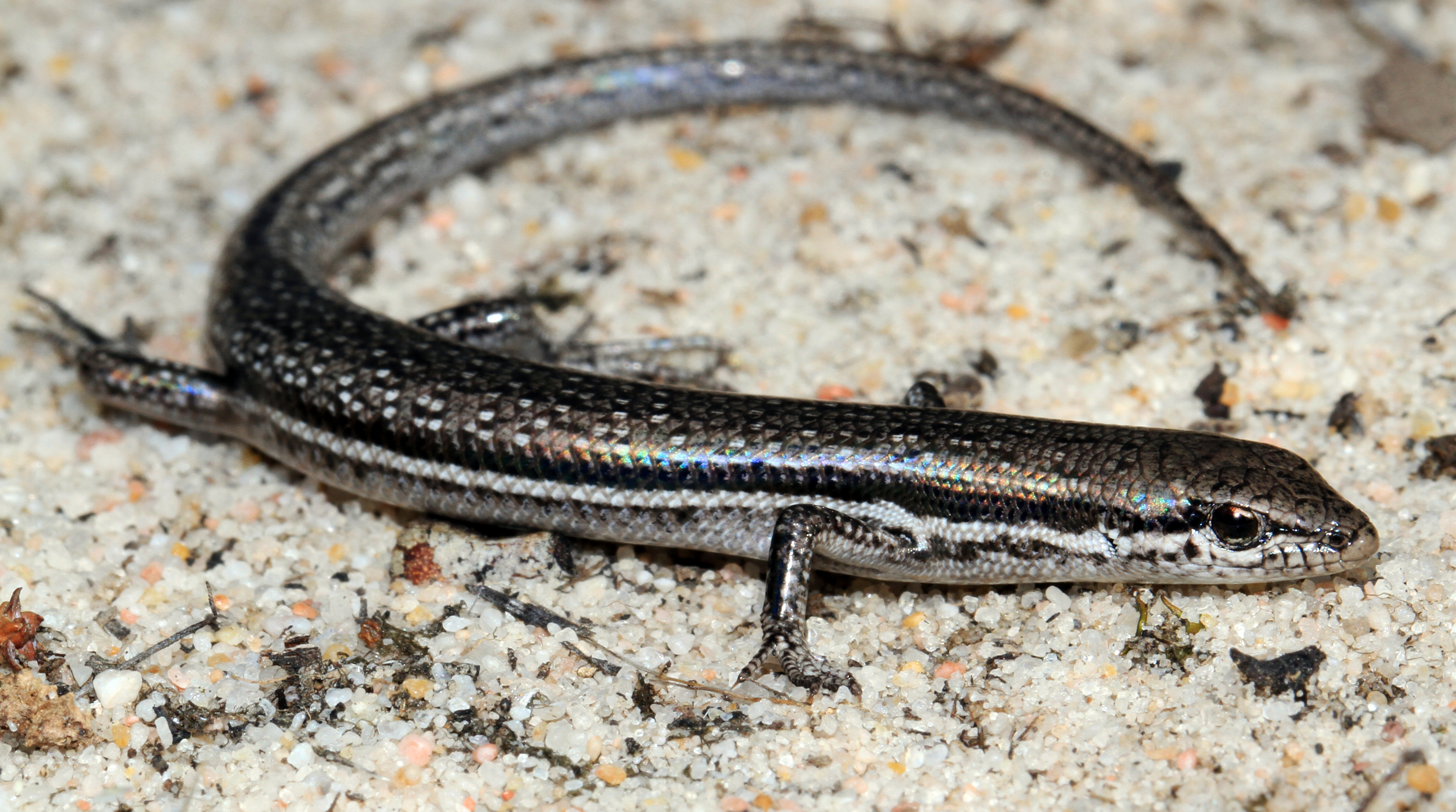
M. obscura
