= Morethia lineoocellata =

Conservation status
- Least Concern (IUCN 3.1)

Scientific classification
- Kingdom: Animalia
- Phylum: Chordata
- Class: Reptilia
- Order: Squamata
- Suborder: Scinciformata
- Infraorder: Scincomorpha
- Family: Eugongylidae
- Genus: Morethia
- Species: M. lineoocellata

Binomial name
- Morethia lineoocellata (Duméril & Bibron, 1839)

Species of lizard

Morethia lineoocellata, the West Coast morethia skink or western pale-flecked morethia, is a species of skink found in Western Australia.
