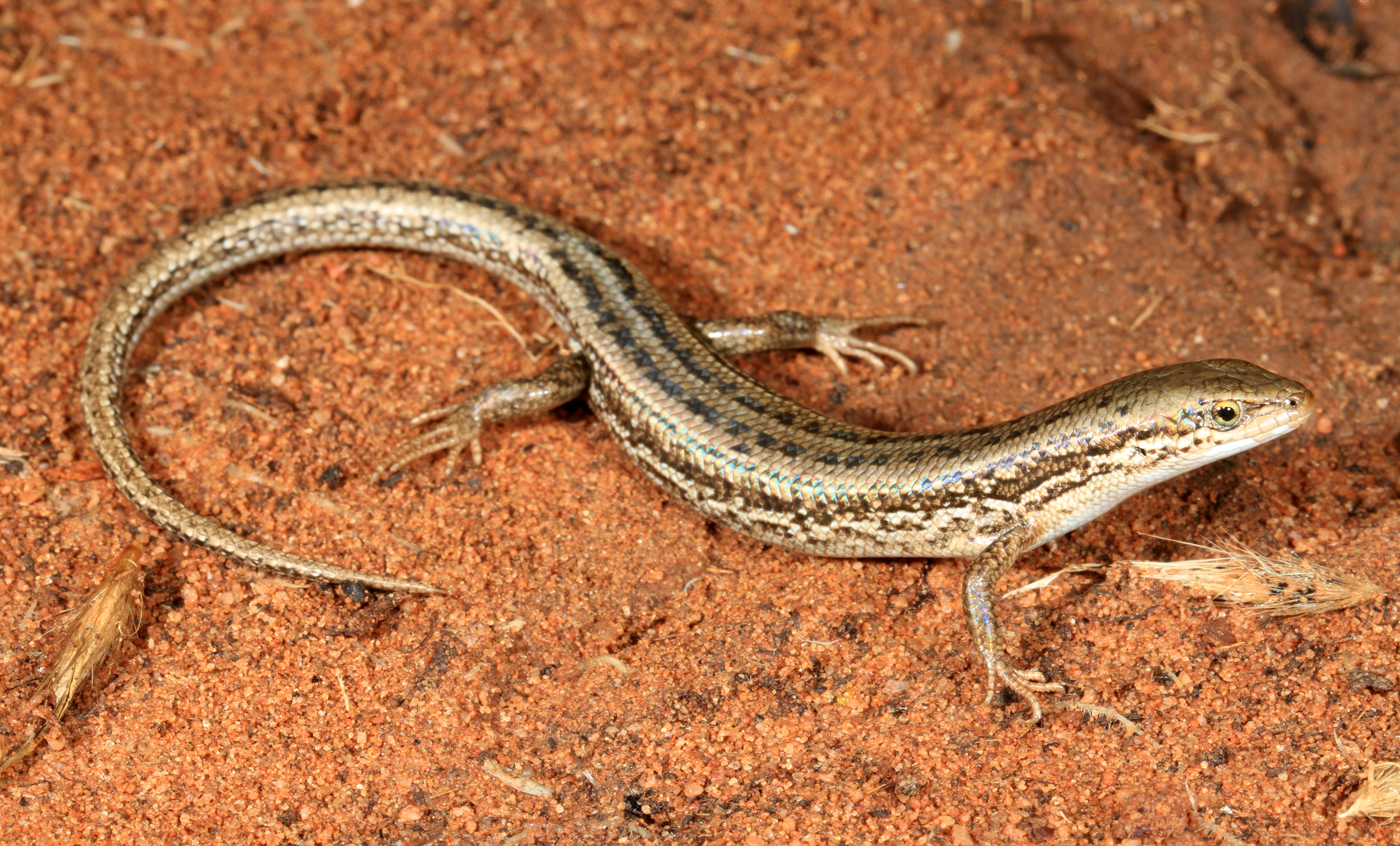
- Morethia adelaidensis (saltbush Morethia skink)

Scientific classification
- Kingdom: Animalia
- Phylum: Chordata
- Class: Reptilia
- Order: Squamata
- Family: Scincidae
- Subfamily: Eugongylinae
- Genus: Morethia; Gray, 1845

Species
- 8 species, see text

= Morethia =

Genus of lizards

Morethia, commonly called Morethia skinks or firetail skinks, is a genus of skinks in the order Squamata that are found in Australia.

== Species ==
Listed alphabetically by specific name.

- Morethia adelaidensis (W. Peters, 1874) – saltbush Morethia skink
- Morethia boulengeri (Ogilby, 1890) – Boulenger's skink, south-eastern Morethia skink
- Morethia butleri (Storr, 1963) – woodland Morethia skink
- Morethia lineoocellata (A.M.C. Duméril & Bibron, 1839) – west coast Morethia skink, western pale-flecked Morethia
- Morethia obscura Storr, 1972 – shrubland Morethia skink
- Morethia ruficauda (Lucas & C. Frost, 1895) – lined firetail skink
- Morethia storri Greer, 1980 – top end firetail skink
- Morethia taeniopleura (W. Peters, 1874) – north-eastern firetail skink, fire-tailed skink

Nota bene: A binomial authority in parentheses indicates that the species was originally described in a genus other than Morethia.
