= Ctenophorus rubens =

Conservation status
- Least Concern (IUCN 3.1)

Scientific classification
- Kingdom: Animalia
- Phylum: Chordata
- Class: Reptilia
- Order: Squamata
- Suborder: Iguania
- Family: Agamidae
- Genus: Ctenophorus
- Species: C. rubens

Binomial name
- Ctenophorus rubens (Storr, 1965)
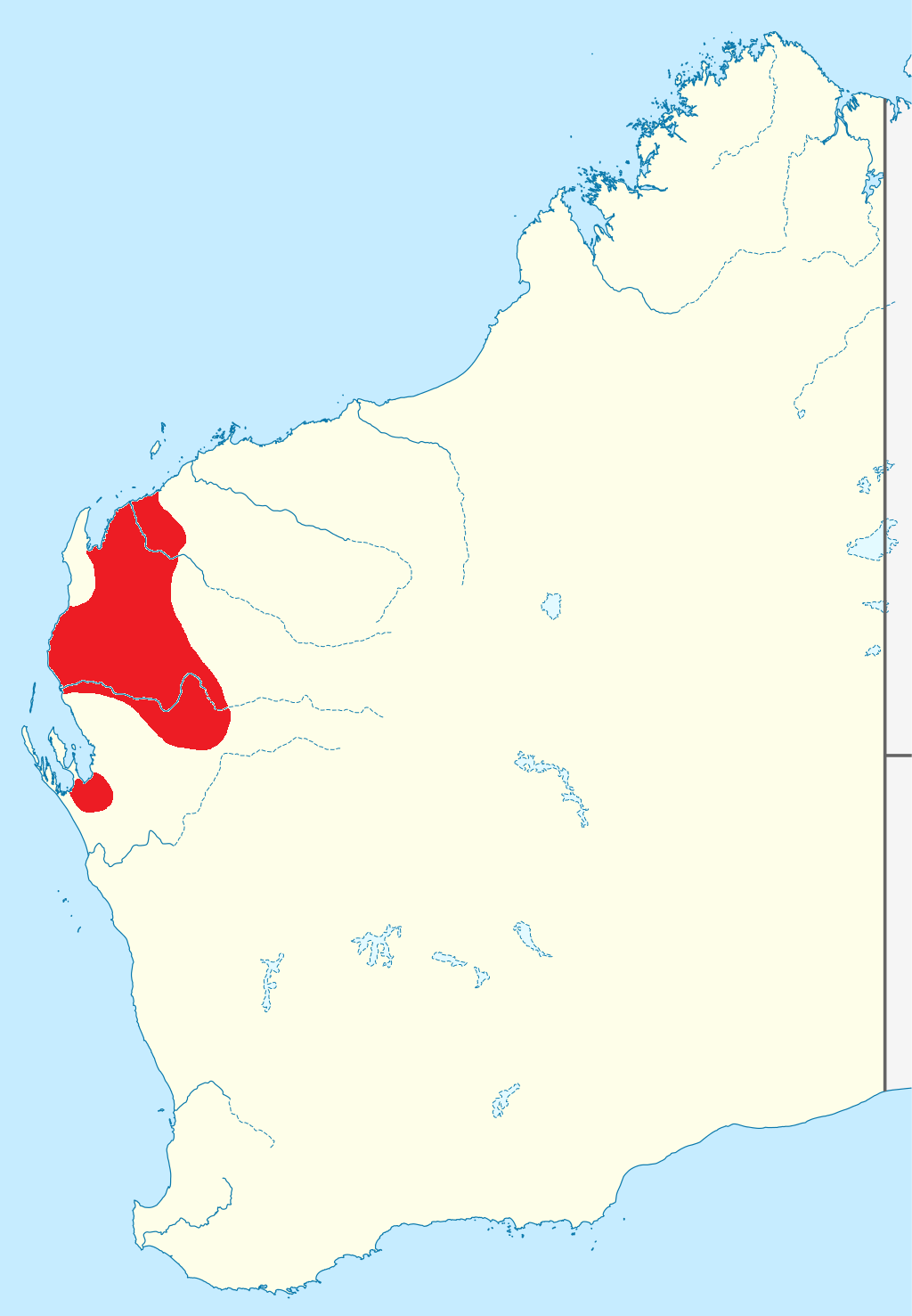
- Distribution of Ctenophorus rubens

Synonyms
- Amphibolurus isolepis rubens (Storr, 1965); Ctenophorus isolepis rubens (Storr, 1965); Phthanodon rubens (Wells & Wellington, 1983)

Species of lizard

Ctenophorus rubens, commonly known as the reddening sand-dragon or rufus sand dragon, is a species of agamid lizard occurring in the arid sandy areas of shrublands and spinifex of the Exmouth Gulf and the adjacent interior of Western Australia, with an isolated population also occurring in the sand dunes south of Hamelin Pool, Western Australia. It was formerly considered to be a subspecies of C. isolepis.
