= Tympanocryptis fictilis =

Scientific classification
- Kingdom: Animalia
- Phylum: Chordata
- Class: Reptilia
- Order: Squamata
- Suborder: Iguania
- Family: Agamidae
- Genus: Tympanocryptis
- Species: T. fictilis

Binomial name
- Tympanocryptis fictilis Melville, Chaplin, Hipsley, Sarre, Sumner, & Hutchinson, 2019

Species of lizard

Tympanocryptis fictilis, the harlequin earless dragon, is a species of agama found in Australia.
