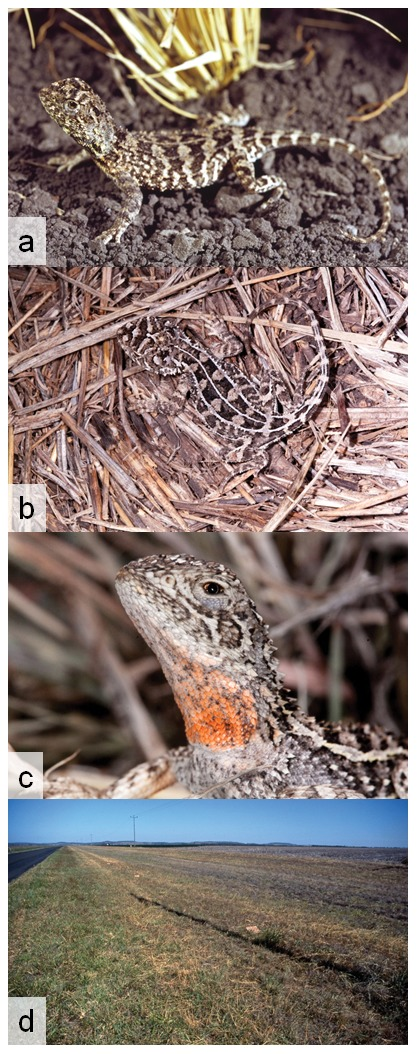

Conservation status
- Endangered (IUCN 3.1)

Scientific classification
- Kingdom: Animalia
- Phylum: Chordata
- Class: Reptilia
- Order: Squamata
- Suborder: Iguania
- Family: Agamidae
- Genus: Tympanocryptis
- Species: T. condaminensis

Binomial name
- Tympanocryptis condaminensis Melville, Smith, Hobson, Hunjan, & Shoo, 2014

= Tympanocryptis condaminensis =

Species of lizard

Tympanocryptis condaminensis, the Condamine earless dragon, is a species of agama found in Australia. It is a small to medium-sized Tympanocryptis with well-developed lateral and ventral body patterning, consisting of strongly contrasting brown-black and white irregular banding and speckling. It is currently known from the eastern Darling Downs, where it inhabits the remnant native grasslands, croplands and roadside verges on the black cracking clays of the Condamine River floodplain.

== Taxonomy ==
The species is named after the Condamine River and floodplain, which this species inhabits.

== Description ==
Tympanocryptis condaminensis is a small to medium-sized Tympanocryptis with well-developed lateral and ventral body patterning, consisting of strongly contrasting brown-black and white irregular banding and speckling. The ventral patterning is concentrated on the head, throat and upper chest, extending posteriorly toward the lateral portions of the belly.

Individuals with heavy ventral patterning usually have a narrow longitudinal stripe of white along the centre line of the upper third of the chest. There is distinct irregular, dorso-ventral banding of brown-black and white colouration along the sides, below a narrow but continuous white lateral stripe which runs from axilla to groin. The ventral and lateral contrasting patterning consists of more white than brown-black.

There are three well-defined pale spots on the dorsal surface of the snout: one above each nostril and one at the end of the snout. There are more than ten inter-nasal scales. The scales on the dorsal surface of the torso are heterogeneous with interspersed unkeeled, weakly keeled and strongly keeled scales. A distinct narrow white stripe runs along the posterior edge of the thigh, extending onto the base of the tail. The femoral pores are absent and there are two preanal pores.

== Distribution and habitat ==
Tympanocryptis condaminensis is currently known from the eastern Darling Downs, as far north as the Pirrinuan/Jimbour area, as far west as the town of Dalby, and south to the township of Clifton. To the east it has been recorded to the eastern extremity of the Darling Downs in the Aubigny/Purrawunda area on the western outskirts of Toowoomba. It inhabits the remnant native grasslands, croplands and roadside verges of the eastern Darling Downs, on the black cracking clays of the Condamine River floodplain.
