= Morethia storri =

Conservation status
- Least Concern (IUCN 3.1)

Scientific classification
- Kingdom: Animalia
- Phylum: Chordata
- Class: Reptilia
- Order: Squamata
- Family: Scincidae
- Genus: Morethia
- Species: M. storri

Binomial name
- Morethia storri Greer, 1981

Species of lizard

Morethia storri, also known commonly as the top end firetail skink or Storr's morethia, is a species of lizard in the family Scincidae. The species is endemic to Australia.

== Etymology ==
The specific name, storri, is in honor of Australian herpetologist Glen Milton Storr.

== Geographic range ==
M. storri is found in Northern Territory and Western Australia, Australia.

== Habitat ==
The preferred natural habitats of M. storri are grassland, shrubland, and forest.

== Reproduction ==
M. storri is oviparous.
