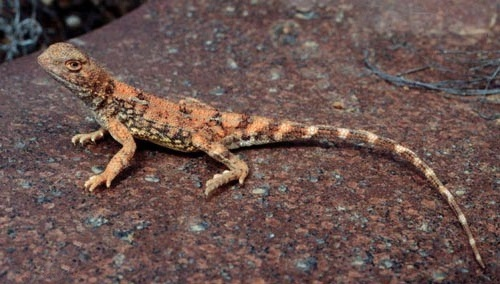

Conservation status
- Least Concern (IUCN 3.1)

Scientific classification
- Kingdom: Animalia
- Phylum: Chordata
- Class: Reptilia
- Order: Squamata
- Suborder: Iguania
- Family: Agamidae
- Genus: Tympanocryptis
- Species: T. tetraporophora

Binomial name
- Tympanocryptis tetraporophora Lucas & Frost, 1895
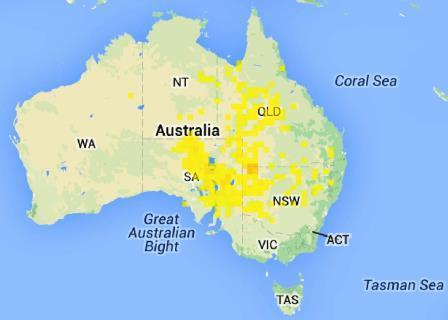
- Distribution Map of Tympanocryptis tetraporophora

= Tympanocryptis tetraporophora =

Species of lizard

Tympanocryptis tetraporophora, also known as Eyrean earless dragon or long-tailed earless dragon, is one of a documented species of a relatively small dragon belonging to the genus Tympanocryptis. Tympanocryptis is differentiated from other genera within the family Agamidae by a tympanum covered with scales and a missing phalange in the fifth toe of the rear foot. T. tetraporophora is a ground dwelling dragon inhabiting semi arid regions of central New South Wales, arid regions of South Australia, Northern Territory, Queensland and tropical grasslands of Northern Queensland.

== Etymology ==
Named because of the presence of four pores, two pre-anal and two femoral.

== Description ==
T tetraporophora has been described as a slender medium-sized Tympanocryptis with a distinct neck and a blunt roundly shaped snout with the nostril been closer to the eyes then to the end of the snout. The limbs are slender and somewhat moderately long and the tail tapers into a rounded tip. They have four pores, two are preanal pores; and two femoral pores, one on each side. Its colour and pattern can be variable with a red-brown to brown base colour with four to six broken dark cross bands on body and a pale ventral stripe that may not be very visible. Typically have dark brown bands on legs and tail. However, in mature females there can be next to no patterning.

== Distribution and habitat ==
T tetraporopho distribution covers a large area, some of which is disjunct and or continuous which includes four states South Australia, the Northern Territory, New South Wales and Queensland. T tetraporophora distribution overlaps with other Tympanocryptis including T cephalus, T lineata, T intima and T pentalineata. T tetraporophora can be identified from the former three species by the presence of four pores and by the latter T pentalineata sp. nov with the absence of five longitudinal body stripes. T tetraporophora habitat is indicative of its wide and varied distribution, from the semi-arid to arid regions encompassing gibber plains, grassland and shrub land associated with stoney plains and hills, hiding in cracks of dried out river floodplains and overflows. Its extensive range also includes tropical savannah grasslands in the Gulf region of northern Queensland.

== Thermoregulation ==
T tetraporaphora has been likened to tiny meerkats, due to the way in which they position themselves to gain the maximum benefit from the sun. They stand erect balancing themselves on their hind limbs and tail with their back facing the sun gaining heat, conversely by aligning their pale underside towards the sun they are able to prevent overheating, therefore been able to regulate their body temperature.

== Sexual Reproduction and Dimorphism ==
T tetraporophora are oviparous meaning they lay eggs. Breeding occurs between early spring and mid autumn. Females become sexually mature at a Mean Snout Vent Length(SVL) around 46mm and males are sexually active at about 42mm SVL. Mature females can range from 46 to 72mm SVL the average been around 58mm. Clutch sizes can vary from between 1 and 14 eggs, there is a positive association with the size of the female and how many eggs are laid. As a female matures they tend to lose the stripes and dark blotches and become totally without any pattern at around 55mm SVL. Mature Males on the other hand do not lose their stripes or blotches.
