= Tympanocryptis cephalus =

Conservation status
- Data Deficient (IUCN 3.1)

Scientific classification
- Kingdom: Animalia
- Phylum: Chordata
- Class: Reptilia
- Order: Squamata
- Suborder: Iguania
- Family: Agamidae
- Genus: Tympanocryptis
- Species: T. cephalus

Binomial name
- Tympanocryptis cephalus Günther, 1867

Species of lizard

Tympanocryptis cephalus, the blotch-tailed earless dragon or coastal pebble-mimic dragon, is a species of agama found in Australia.
