= Tympanocryptis petersi =

Scientific classification
- Kingdom: Animalia
- Phylum: Chordata
- Class: Reptilia
- Order: Squamata
- Suborder: Iguania
- Family: Agamidae
- Genus: Tympanocryptis
- Species: T. petersi

Binomial name
- Tympanocryptis petersi Melville, Chaplin, Hipsley, Sarre, Sumner, & Hutchinson, 2019

Species of lizard

Tympanocryptis petersi, the lined earless dragon, is a species of agama found in South Australia. The specific epithet, petersi, honours Wilhelm Carl Hartwig Peters, who described the genus and type species, Tympanocryptis lineata.
