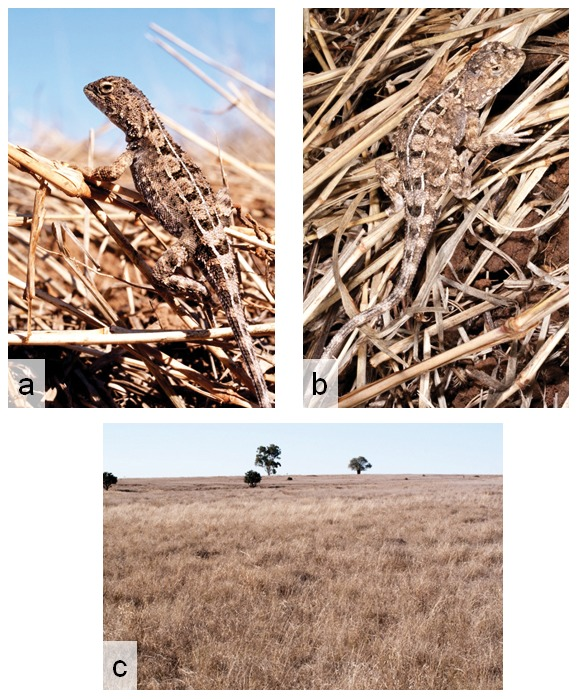

Conservation status
- Endangered (IUCN 3.1)

Scientific classification
- Kingdom: Animalia
- Phylum: Chordata
- Class: Reptilia
- Order: Squamata
- Suborder: Iguania
- Family: Agamidae
- Genus: Tympanocryptis
- Species: T. wilsoni

Binomial name
- Tympanocryptis wilsoni Melville, Smith, Hobson, Hunjan, & Shoo, 2014

= Tympanocryptis wilsoni =

Species of lizard

Tympanocryptis wilsoni, the Roma earless dragon, is a species of agama found in Queensland, Australia. It is named after the Australian herpetologist Steve Wilson. It is a small to medium-sized Tympanocryptis with a well-developed lateral and ventral body patterning, consisting of extensive brown-black speckling. The species is known from the native grasslands near the town of Roma, where it inhabits grasslands on sloping terrains.

== Taxonomy ==
Tympanocryptis wilsoni is named after the Australian herpetologist Steve Wilson to honour his work in Australian herpetology, especially in helping understand Tympanocryptis diversity in Queensland. Wilson discovered and collected the type specimens of the species.

== Description ==
Tympanocryptis wilsoni is a small to medium-sized Tympanocryptis with a well-developed lateral and ventral body patterning, consisting of extensive brown-black speckling. The ventral patterning is concentrated on the head, throat and upper chest, extending posteriorly toward the lateral portions of the belly. There is heavy brown-black speckling along the sides but white lateral stripe is absent. The black-brown colouration is greater than the white in the ventral and lateral patterning. There are three well-defined pale spots on dorsal surface of snout: one above each nostril and one at end of snout. There are less than ten inter-nasal scales. The scales on dorsal surface of the torso are heterogeneous with interspersed un-keeled, weakly keeled, and strongly keeled scales. The femoral pores absent and there are two preanal pores.

== Distribution and habitat ==
The species is known from the native grasslands near the town of Roma, from Hodgson approximately 20 km west to Mt Abundance approximately 50 km south-west of Roma. It inhabits grasslands on sloping terrains, which are dominated by Mitchell grasses in the western Darling Downs.
