= Tympanocryptis tolleyi =

Scientific classification
- Kingdom: Animalia
- Phylum: Chordata
- Class: Reptilia
- Order: Squamata
- Suborder: Iguania
- Family: Agamidae
- Genus: Tympanocryptis
- Species: T. tolleyi

Binomial name
- Tympanocryptis tolleyi Melville, Chaplin, Hipsley, Sarre, Sumner, & Hutchinson, 2019

Species of lizard

Tympanocryptis tolleyi, the Gawler earless dragon, is a species of agama found in South Australia.
