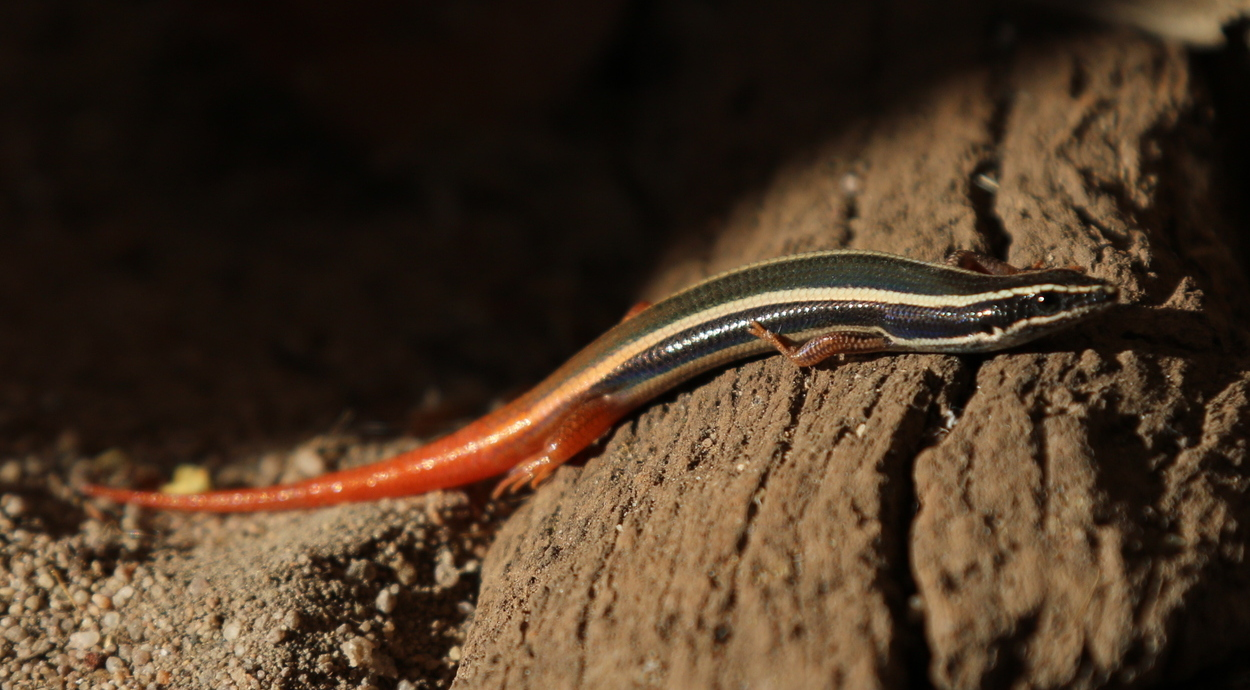
- Lined Firetail Skink

Conservation status
- Least Concern (IUCN 3.1)

Scientific classification
- Kingdom: Animalia
- Phylum: Chordata
- Class: Reptilia
- Order: Squamata
- Family: Scincidae
- Genus: Morethia
- Species: M. ruficauda

Binomial name
- Morethia ruficauda Lucas & Frost, 1895)

= Morethia ruficauda =

Species of lizard

Morethia ruficauda, the lined firetail skink, is a species of skink found in Northern Territory, Western Australia and South Australia in Australia.
