= Morethia butleri =

Conservation status
- Least Concern (IUCN 3.1)

Scientific classification
- Kingdom: Animalia
- Phylum: Chordata
- Class: Reptilia
- Order: Squamata
- Family: Scincidae
- Genus: Morethia
- Species: M. butleri

Binomial name
- Morethia butleri (Storr, 1963)

Synonyms
- Ablepharus butleri Storr, 1963; Morethia butleri — Greer, 1974

Species of lizard

Morethia butleri, also known commonly as Butler's Morethia and the woodland Morethia skink, is a species of lizard in the family Scincidae. The species is endemic to Australia.

== Etymology ==
The specific name, butleri is in honor of Australian naturalist William Henry "Harry" Butler.

== Geographic range ==
M. butleri is found in the Australian states of South Australia and Western Australia.

== Habitat ==
The preferred natural habitat of M. butleri is shrubland.

== Reproduction ==
M. butleri is oviparous.
