= Tympanocryptis houstoni =

Conservation status
- Least Concern (IUCN 3.1)

Scientific classification
- Kingdom: Animalia
- Phylum: Chordata
- Class: Reptilia
- Order: Squamata
- Suborder: Iguania
- Family: Agamidae
- Genus: Tympanocryptis
- Species: T. houstoni

Binomial name
- Tympanocryptis houstoni Storr, 1982

Species of lizard

Tympanocryptis houstoni, also known as Houston's earless dragon or Nullarbor earless dragon, is one of a documented species of a relatively small dragon belonging to the genus Tympanocryptis.

== Habitat ==
This terrestrial species is found in the low, arid shrublands, and saltbush and bluebush flatlands of South Australia and Western Australia. It occupies chenopod shrublands on clay soils of the Nullarbor Plain.

== Description ==
Snout-to-vent length is 6 cm on average.

== Etymology ==
Tympanocryptis: 'hidden ear' Houstoni: Presumably named after T.E. Houston, author of Dragon lizards and Goannas of South Australia and the first to recognise the distinctiveness of this taxon.
