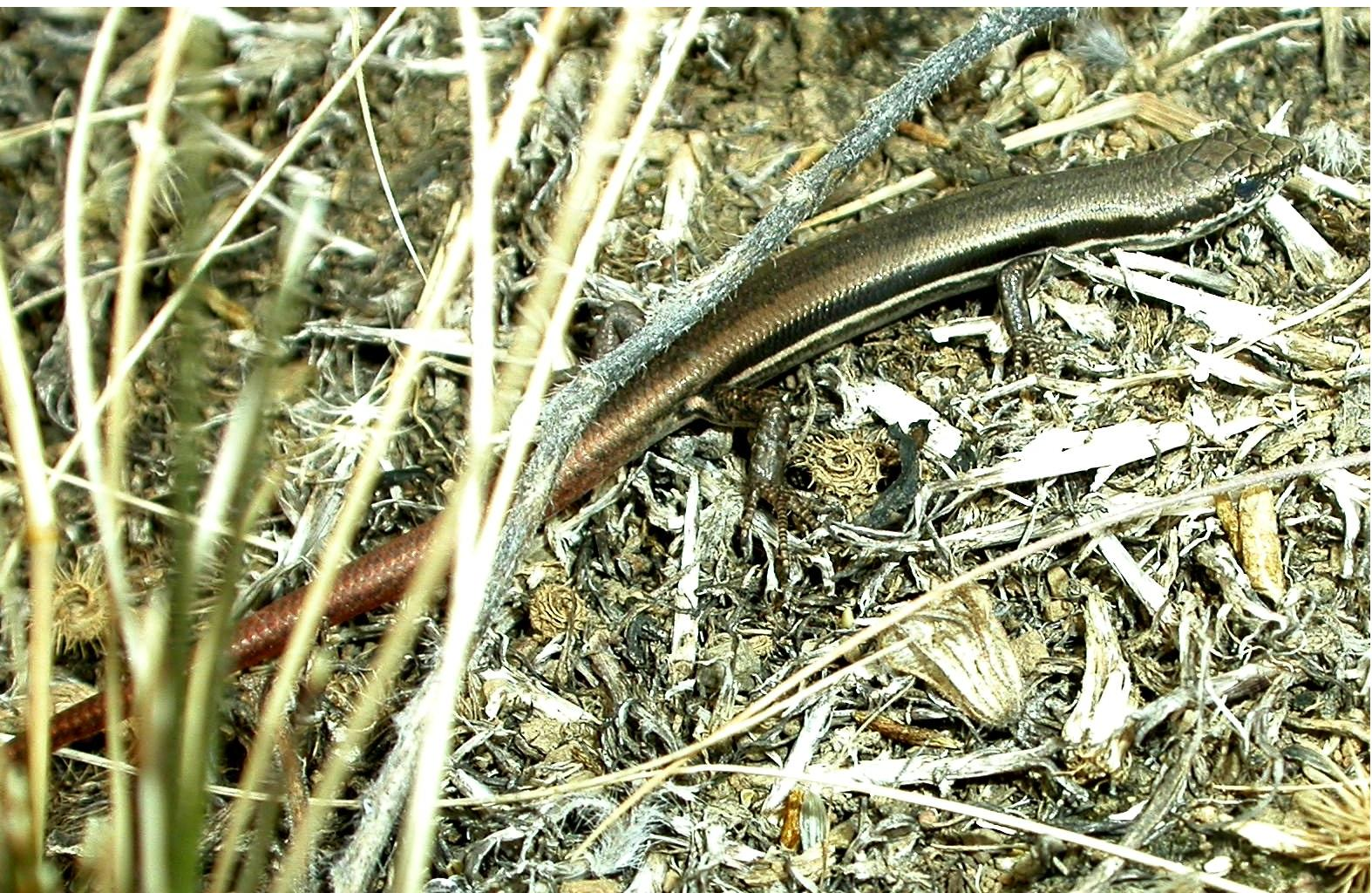

Conservation status
- Least Concern (IUCN 3.1)

Scientific classification
- Kingdom: Animalia
- Phylum: Chordata
- Class: Reptilia
- Order: Squamata
- Family: Scincidae
- Genus: Morethia
- Species: M. boulengeri

Binomial name
- Morethia boulengeri (Ogilby, 1890)
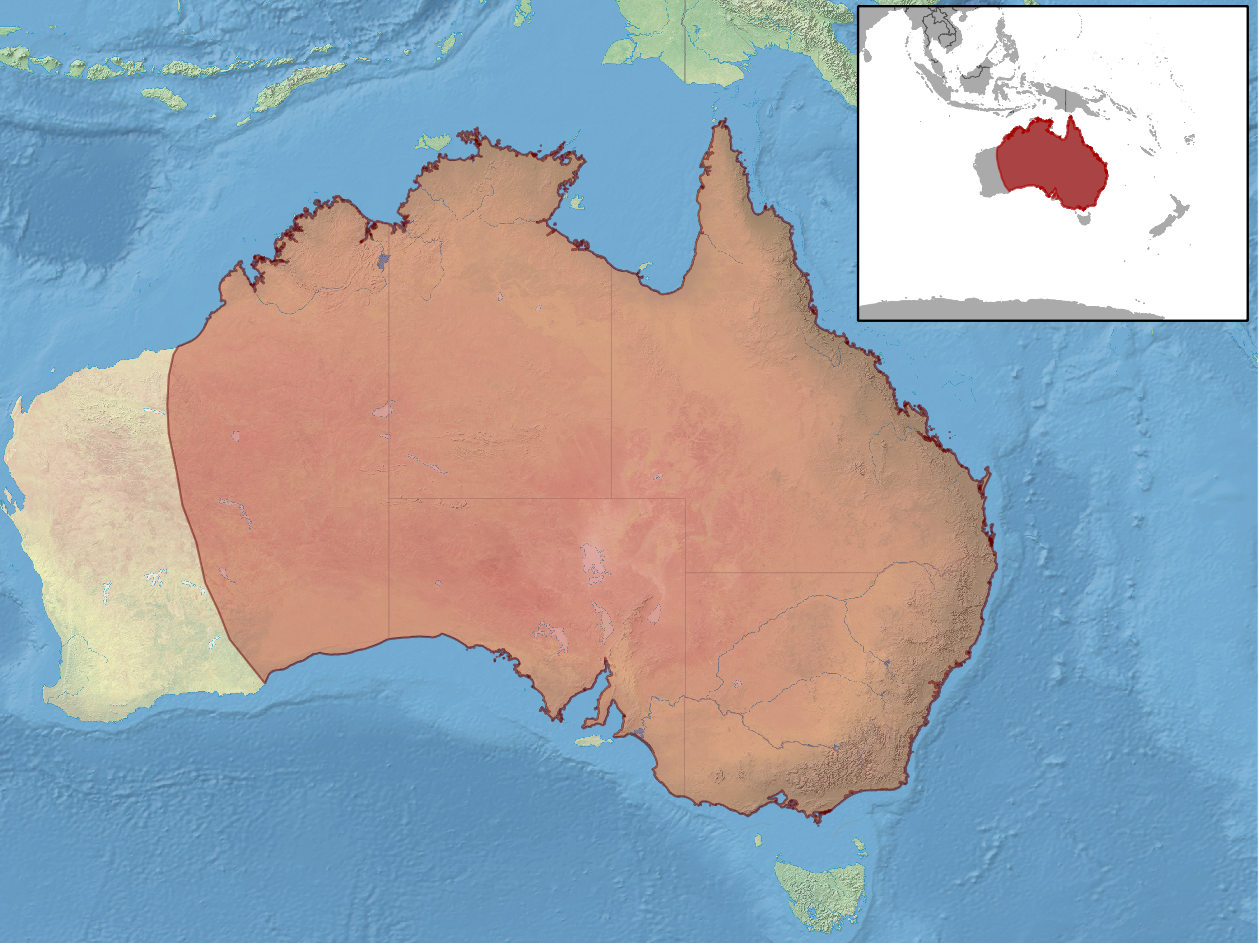

Synonyms
- Ablepharus boulengeri Ogilby, 1890; Morethia boulengeri — Greer, 1974

= Morethia boulengeri =

Species of lizard

Morethia boulengeri is a species of lizard in the family Scincidae. The species is endemic to Australia.

== Common names and etymology ==
Common names for M. boulengeri include south-eastern Morethia skink, Boulenger's snake-eyed skink, Boulenger's Morethia, and Boulenger's skink.

=== Etymology ===
The specific name, boulengeri, as well as three of the common names for this skink, are in honour of George Albert Boulenger, a Belgian-born British herpetologist who described a wide range of reptile, amphibian, and fish species new to science.

== Description ==
The markings and colouration of M. boulengeri can vary significantly between individuals. In general, it is grey or brown in colour with darker-coloured flecks in a longitudinal pattern along the dorsal side of the lizard, while the ventral side is largely white. A thin white stripe also runs longitudinally from the mouth to the groin region on both sides. Above the white line is a thicker black stripe that borders the white stripes. Juvenile lizards also have a distinctive red-orange tinge on the ventral side of the tail, which is a distinguishing feature of the genus Morethia. Boulenger's skink can grow to a total length (including tail) of 10 cm (3.9 in); however, on average it reaches only 8 cm (3.1 in) nose to tail tip, or 4.5–5 cm (1.8–2.0 in) snout-to-vent. This species of skink also exhibits square-shaped supraciliary scales above the eye region.

== Geographic range and ecology ==
M. boulengeri is endemic to Australia and can be found across the majority of the country, in at least part of every state and territory except Tasmania. It is a generalist species that has the ability to inhabit a wide range of environments in semi-arid and arid zones. It survives in the leaf litter and dead fallen vegetation in dry sclerophyll forests, mallee, desert, scrublands, woodlands, and low shrublands ecosystems. It is found in high numbers in the Murray catchment area, in southern New South Wales. Sometimes the density of M. boulengeri is as high as several hundred individuals in one hectare of land.

== Diet ==
M. boulengeri is an insectivorous species, like the majority of skinks, which means the diet of this species consist almost exclusively of insects. It eats predominately arthropod species and snails, with moths making up a large portion of its diet. Spiders, beetles, ants, cockroaches, and other bugs are also a part of the diet. All of these prey species are abundant within Australia and in the leaf litter habitat that M. boulengeri occupies.

== Reproduction ==
M. boulengeri mates in the warmer months in spring and summer. During this time the throat of the male skink turns vibrant orange in correspondence with increased testicle size, indicating to the female that the male is fertile and available for mating. This species of skink is oviparous, which is a method of reproduction in which the female lays eggs. A female M. boulengeri generally reaches sexual maturity and begins breeding within the first year of life. On average, three eggs are laid per clutch, and a female produces approximately three clutches per year. The clutch is incubated for approximately 60 days before the eggs hatch. During this time the rate of oxygen consumption dramatically increases.
