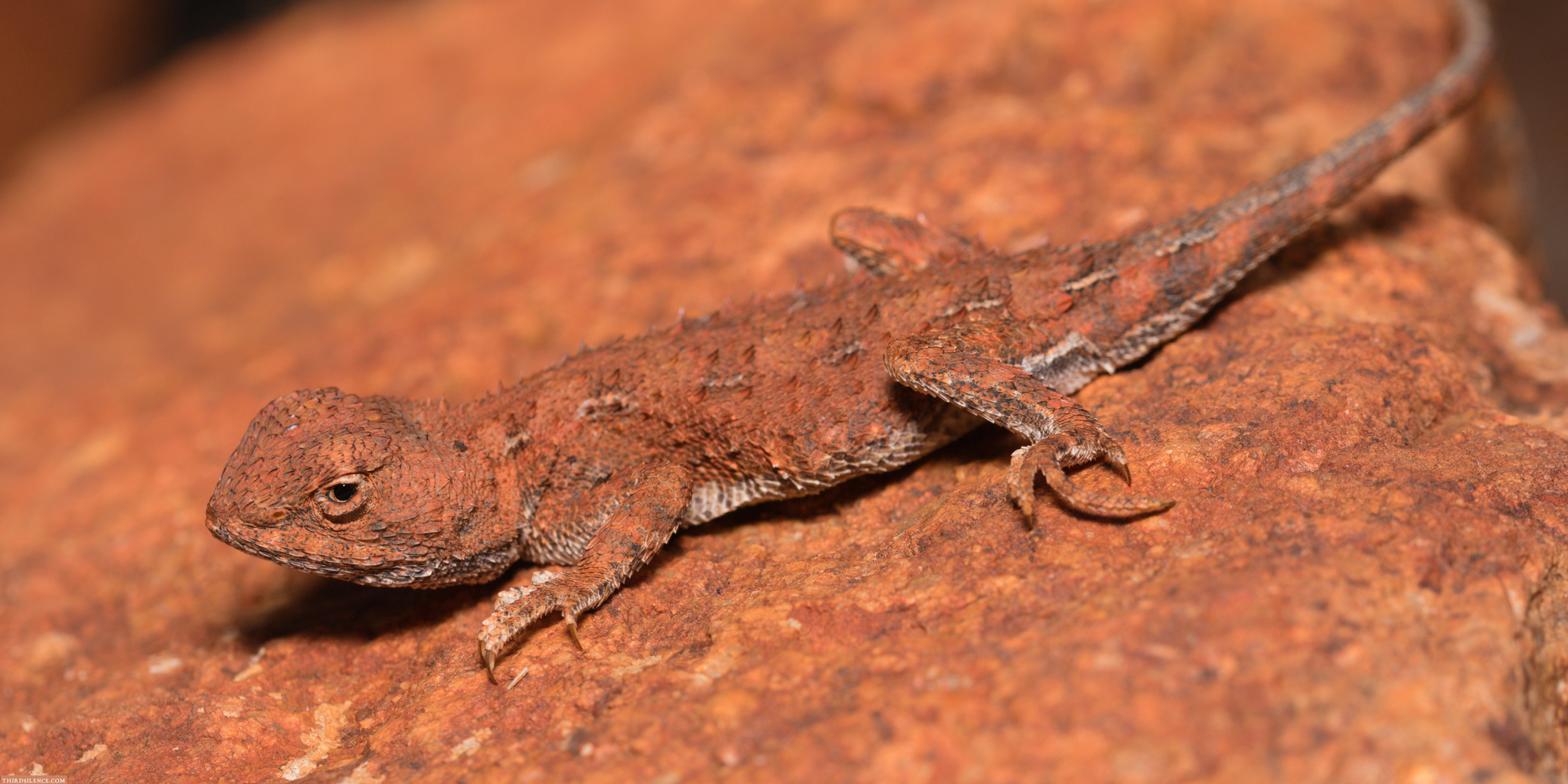

Conservation status
- Least Concern (IUCN 3.1)

Scientific classification
- Kingdom: Animalia
- Phylum: Chordata
- Class: Reptilia
- Order: Squamata
- Suborder: Iguania
- Family: Agamidae
- Genus: Tympanocryptis
- Species: T. centralis

Binomial name
- Tympanocryptis centralis Sternfeld, 1925

= Tympanocryptis centralis =

Species of lizard

Tympanocryptis centralis, also known as central Australian earless dragon or central pebble dragon, is a relatively small dragon species belonging to the genus Tympanocryptis.

This is a common species, with an apparently stable population.

== Habitat ==
This species utilizes a variety of desert habitats, but is most often found in association with stony ranges. The species often takes shelter in spinifex, but can also be found in Eucalypt shrubland.

It is found in the Northern Territory, South Australia, and Western Australia.

== Etymology ==
Tympanocryptis: 'hidden ear'.

Centralis: 'centralian', referring to the central distribution.
