= Morethia taeniopleura =

Conservation status
- Least Concern (IUCN 3.1)

Scientific classification
- Kingdom: Animalia
- Phylum: Chordata
- Class: Reptilia
- Order: Squamata
- Suborder: Scinciformata
- Infraorder: Scincomorpha
- Family: Eugongylidae
- Genus: Morethia
- Species: M. taeniopleura

Binomial name
- Morethia taeniopleura (Peters, 1874)

Species of lizard

Morethia taeniopleura, the northeastern firetail skink, is a species of skink found in Queensland in Australia.
