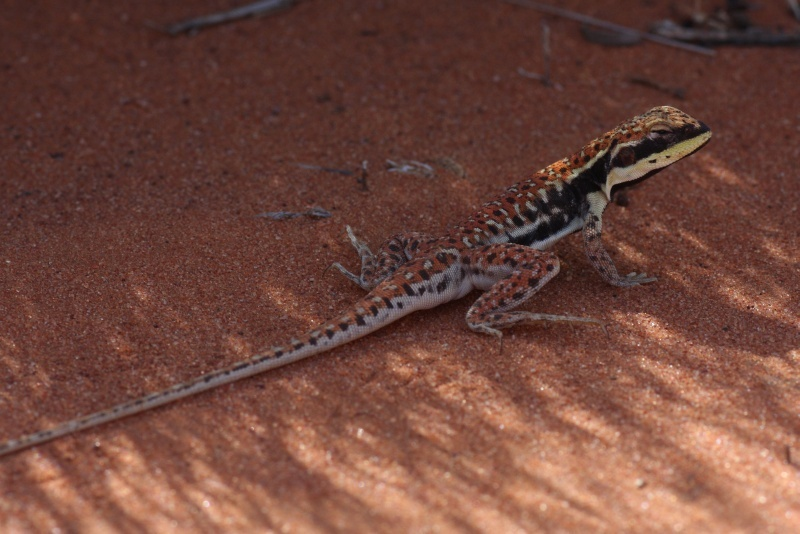

Conservation status
- Least Concern (IUCN 3.1)

Scientific classification
- Kingdom: Animalia
- Phylum: Chordata
- Class: Reptilia
- Order: Squamata
- Suborder: Iguania
- Family: Agamidae
- Genus: Ctenophorus
- Species: C. isolepis

Binomial name
- Ctenophorus isolepis (Fischer, 1881)

Subspecies
- C. i. isolepis C. i. citrinus C. i. gularis
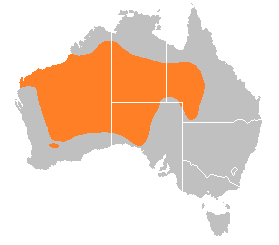
- Distribution of Ctenophorus isolepis

Synonyms
- Amphibolurus isolepis (Fischer, 1881); Grammatophra isolepis (Fischer, 1881); Phthanodon isolepis (Fischer, 1881)

= Ctenophorus isolepis =

Species of lizard

Ctenophorus isolepis, commonly known as the central military dragon, military dragon or military sand dragon, is a species of agamid lizard occurring in the arid parts of central and western Australia.

== Description ==
Adult central military dragons range in colour from yellowish to reddish-brown, with blotches and flecks ranging in colour from pale to dark. Adults have a total length (including its tail) of 21–26.5 cm (8.3–10.4 in).

== Ecology, behaviour and distribution ==
The central military dragon lives in arid parts of central and western Australia areas of sand-ridge deserts and loamy flats usually in areas with spinifex ground cover which they will hide in if alarmed. They live entirely above-ground, usually avoiding elevated and exposed areas, instead preferring to forage in areas of bare ground between low vegetation. They occur in outback Western Australia, across into the southern half of the Northern Territory and north-western South Australia, as well as into south-western Queensland.

C. rubens was previously considered to be a subspecies of the central military dragon.
