= Tympanocryptis macra =

Scientific classification
- Kingdom: Animalia
- Phylum: Chordata
- Class: Reptilia
- Order: Squamata
- Suborder: Iguania
- Family: Agamidae
- Genus: Tympanocryptis
- Species: T. macra

Binomial name
- Tympanocryptis macra Storr, 1982

Synonyms
- Tympanocryptis lineata macra Storr, 1982

Species of lizard

Tympanocryptis macra, the savannah earless dragon, is a species of agama found in northern Western Australia and the Northern Territory. It was described originally as Tympanocryptis lineata macra in 1982 by Glen Milton Storr.
