= Tympanocryptis osbornei =

Scientific classification
- Kingdom: Animalia
- Phylum: Chordata
- Class: Reptilia
- Order: Squamata
- Suborder: Iguania
- Family: Agamidae
- Genus: Tympanocryptis
- Species: T. osbornei

Binomial name
- Tympanocryptis osbornei Melville, Chaplin, Hutchinson, Sumner, Gruber, MacDonald, & Sarre, 2019

Species of lizard

Tympanocryptis osbornei, the Monaro grassland earless dragon, is a species of agama found in Australia.
