= Francis John Mitchell =

Australian herpetologist (1929–1970)

Francis John Mitchell (1929–1970) was a biologist and curator with a special interest in herpetology. Active from South Australia, he was vice president of the state's Royal Society and employed at South Australian Museum. His initial positions at the museum related to the reptile and frog collections, leading to his role as head curator of the vertebrates in 1965. An active and competitive skin diver who was involved in ocean sports and associations, Mitchell was able to align these interests by obtaining specimens from spear and big game fisherman.

== Work, legacy, and honors ==
Mitchell discovered and described at least a dozen species of reptiles, including the Black-palmed Rock Monitor, Varanus glebopalma. Three species of lizards were named after Francis Mitchell: Diplodactylus mitchelli Kluge, 1963; Pogona mitchelli (Badham, 1976); and Varanus mitchelli Mertens, 1958.
