= Jane Melville =

Australian herpetologist

- Education: University of Tasmania
- Scientific career
- Workplaces: Museums Victoria
- Thesis: The evolution of locomotory mode in the lizard genus Niveoscincus : an ecomorphological analysis of ecology, behaviour, morphology and performance ability (1999)

Jane Melville AM is an Australian herpetologist at Museums Victoria. Her research focuses on the taxonomy and genetics of reptiles and amphibians.

== Career ==
Melville completed a BsC (hons) at the University of Tasmania (UTAS), winning the Ralston Trust Prize for Best Honours Thesis. She remained at UTAS to undertake a PhD in zoology, awarded for her thesis "The evolution of locomotory mode in the lizard genus Niveoscincus : an ecomorphological analysis of ecology, behaviour, morphology and performance ability".

Melville joined Museums Victoria in 2002 and served as curator of herpetology from 2004 to 2008. She was promoted to senior curator, terrestrial vertebrates in 2008. She was appointed an honorary herpetologist at the University of Melbourne in 2002 and is an associate professor in the School of Biological Sciences at Monash University.

== Awards and recognition ==
Melville was awarded a Churchill Fellowship in 2016 and a Fulbright Fellowship in 2019. She was appointed a Member of the Order of Australia (AM) in the 2021 Queen's Birthday Honours for "significant service to herpetological research, and to the museums sector".

== Selected publications ==
Melville has written of over 75 peer-reviewed journal articles, including:

- Jane Melville; Roy Swain (August 2000). "Evolutionary relationships between morphology, performance and habitat openness in the lizard genus Niveoscincus (Scincidae: Lygosominae)". Biological Journal of the Linnean Society. 70 (4): 667–683. doi:10.1111/j.1095-8312.2000.tb00222.x. ISSN 0024-4066. Wikidata Q123250684.
- Jane Melville; Luke J Harmon; Jonathan B Losos (1 March 2006). "Intercontinental community convergence of ecology and morphology in desert lizards". Proceedings of the Royal Society B. 273 (1586): 557–563. doi:10.1098/rspb.2005.3328. ISSN 0962-8452. PMC 1560059. PMID 16537126. Wikidata Q51189816.
- Margaret Mary Byrne; D K Yeates; L Joseph; et al. (27 August 2008). "Birth of a biome: insights into the assembly and maintenance of the Australian arid zone biota". Molecular Ecology. 17 (20): 4398–4417. doi:10.1111/j.1365-294x.2008.03899.x. ISSN 0962-1083. PMID 18761619. Wikidata Q33365405.
- Margaret Byrne; Dorothy A. Steane; Leo Joseph; et al. (26 May 2011). "Decline of a biome: evolution, contraction, fragmentation, extinction and invasion of the Australian mesic zone biota". Journal of Biogeography. 38 (9): 1635–1656. doi:10.1111/j.1365-2699.2011.02535.x. ISSN 0305-0270. Wikidata Q56967521.
- Katie L Smith; Luke J Harmon; Luke P Shoo; Jane Melville (18 January 2011). "Evidence of constrained phenotypic evolution in a cryptic species complex of agamid lizards". Evolution. 65 (4): 976–992. doi:10.1111/j.1558-5646.2010.01211.x. ISSN 0014-3820. PMID 21166790. Wikidata Q33774563.
- Sarah M. Legge; Libby Rumpff; John C. Z. Woinarski; et al. (2 March 2022). "The conservation impacts of ecological disturbance: Time‐bound estimates of population loss and recovery for fauna affected by the 2019–2020 Australian megafires". Global Ecology and Biogeography. 31 (10): 2085–2104. doi:10.1111/geb.13473. ISSN 1466-8238. Wikidata Q112784494.

== See also ==
- Category:Taxa named by Jane Melville
