= C. inornatus =

C. inornatus may refer to:

- Callosciurus inornatus, a squirrel species
- Caprimulgus inornatus, a nightjar species
- Chlorospingus inornatus, a bush-tanager species
- Copadichromis inornatus, a fish species
- Ctenotus inornatus, a skink species in the genus Ctenotus

== See also ==
- Inornatus
