= Ctenotus delli =

Conservation status
- Least Concern (IUCN 3.1)

Scientific classification
- Kingdom: Animalia
- Phylum: Chordata
- Class: Reptilia
- Order: Squamata
- Family: Scincidae
- Genus: Ctenotus
- Species: C. delli

Binomial name
- Ctenotus delli Storr, 1974

Species of lizard

Ctenotus delli, also known commonly as the Darling Range south-west ctenotus or the Darling Range southwest ctenotus, is a species of skink, a lizard in the family Scincidae. The species is endemic to Western Australia.

== Etymology ==
The specific name, delli, is in honor of Australian herpetologist John Dell.

== Geographic range ==
C. delli is found in the south-west corner of the Australian state of Western Australia.

== Habitat ==
The preferred natural habitats of C. delli are forest and rocky areas.

== Description ==
Small for its genus, the average snout-to-vent length (SVL) of C. delli is 4.5 cm (1.8 in). The average tail length is about one and two thirds SVL.

== Reproduction ==
C. delli is oviparous.

== Taxonomy ==
C. delli is a member of the C. labillardieri species group.
