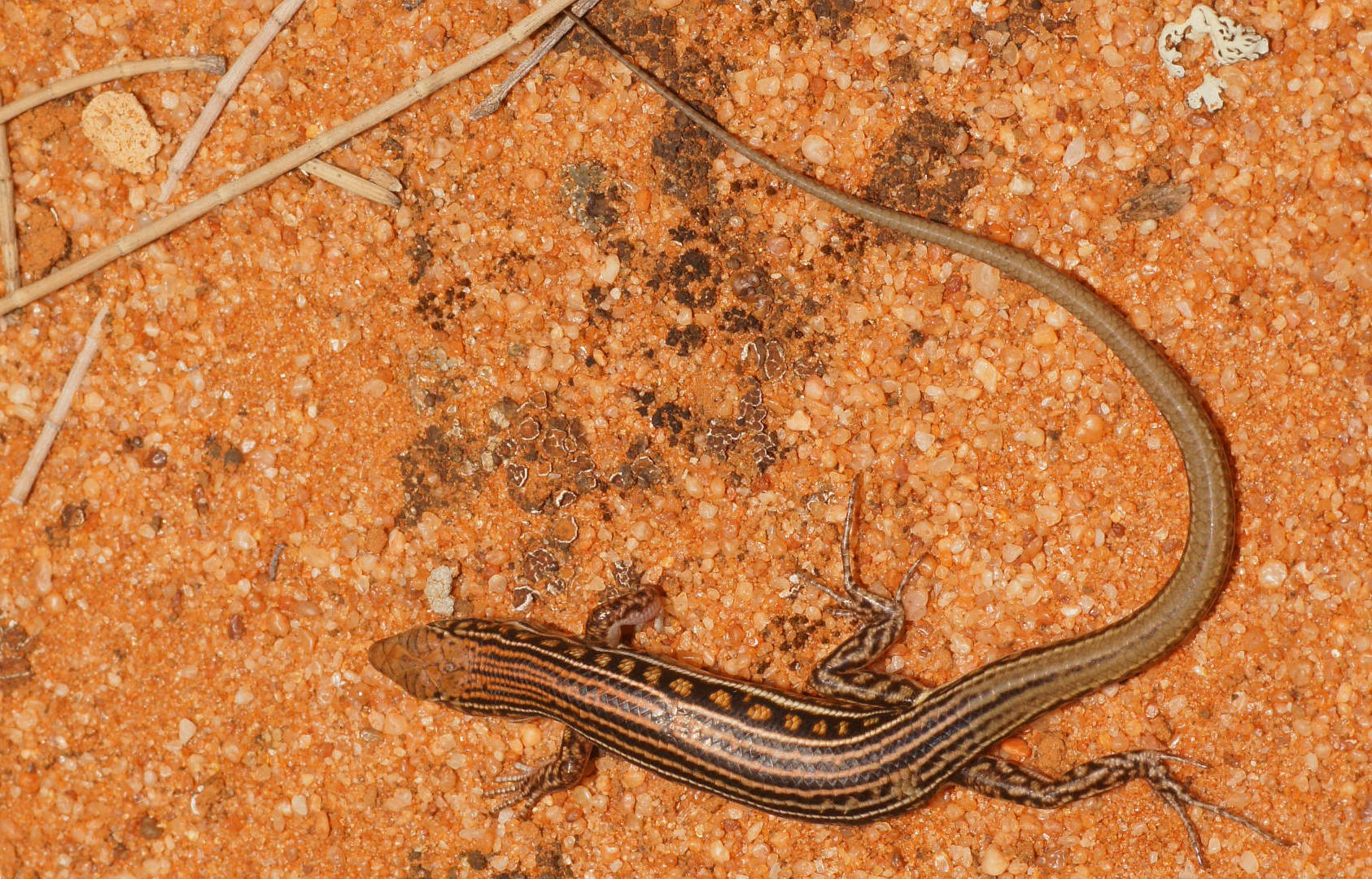

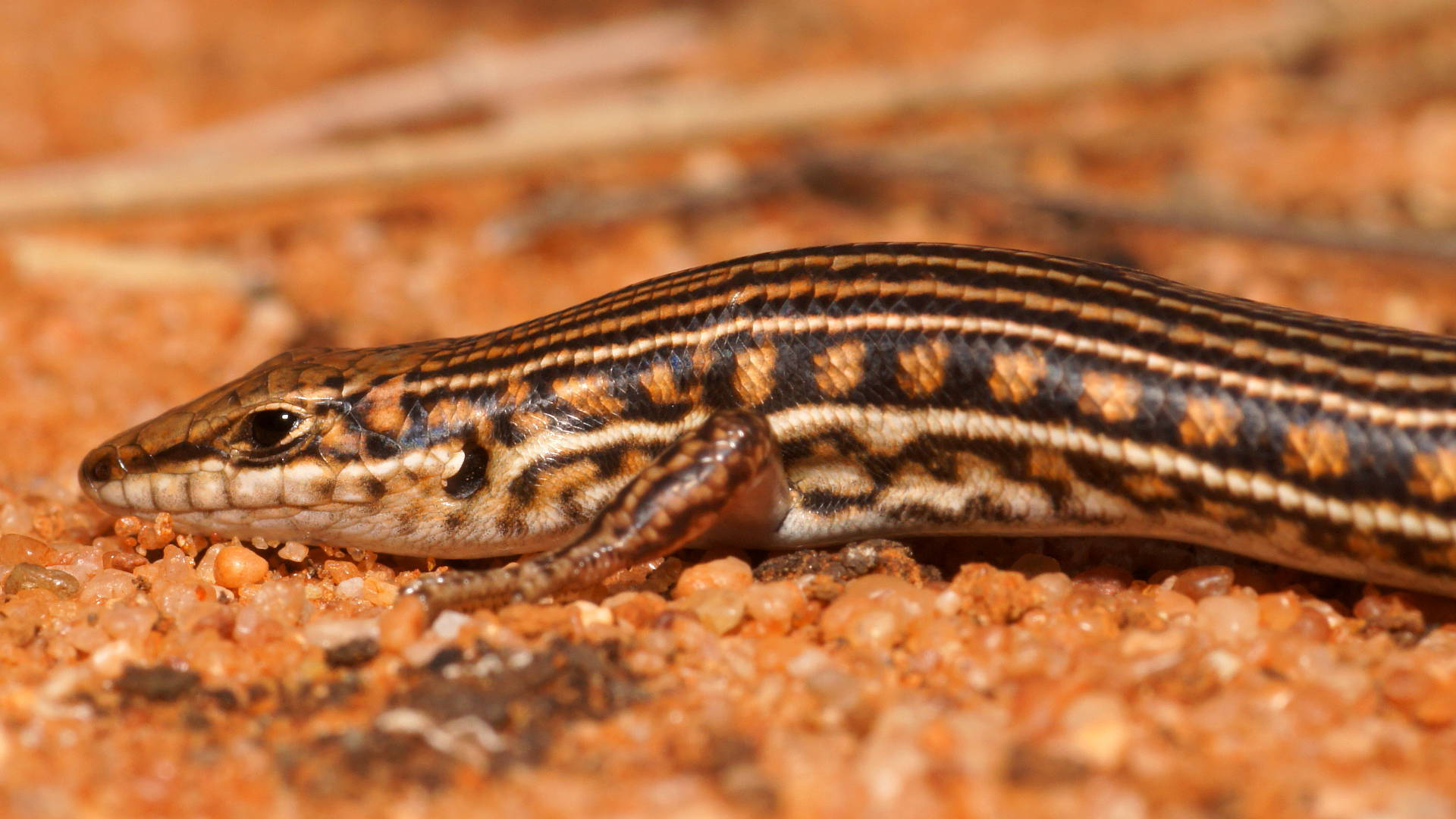

Conservation status
- Least Concern (IUCN 3.1)

Scientific classification
- Kingdom: Animalia
- Phylum: Chordata
- Class: Reptilia
- Order: Squamata
- Family: Scincidae
- Genus: Ctenotus
- Species: C. schomburgkii

Binomial name
- Ctenotus schomburgkii (Peters, 1863)

= Ctenotus schomburgkii =

Species of lizard

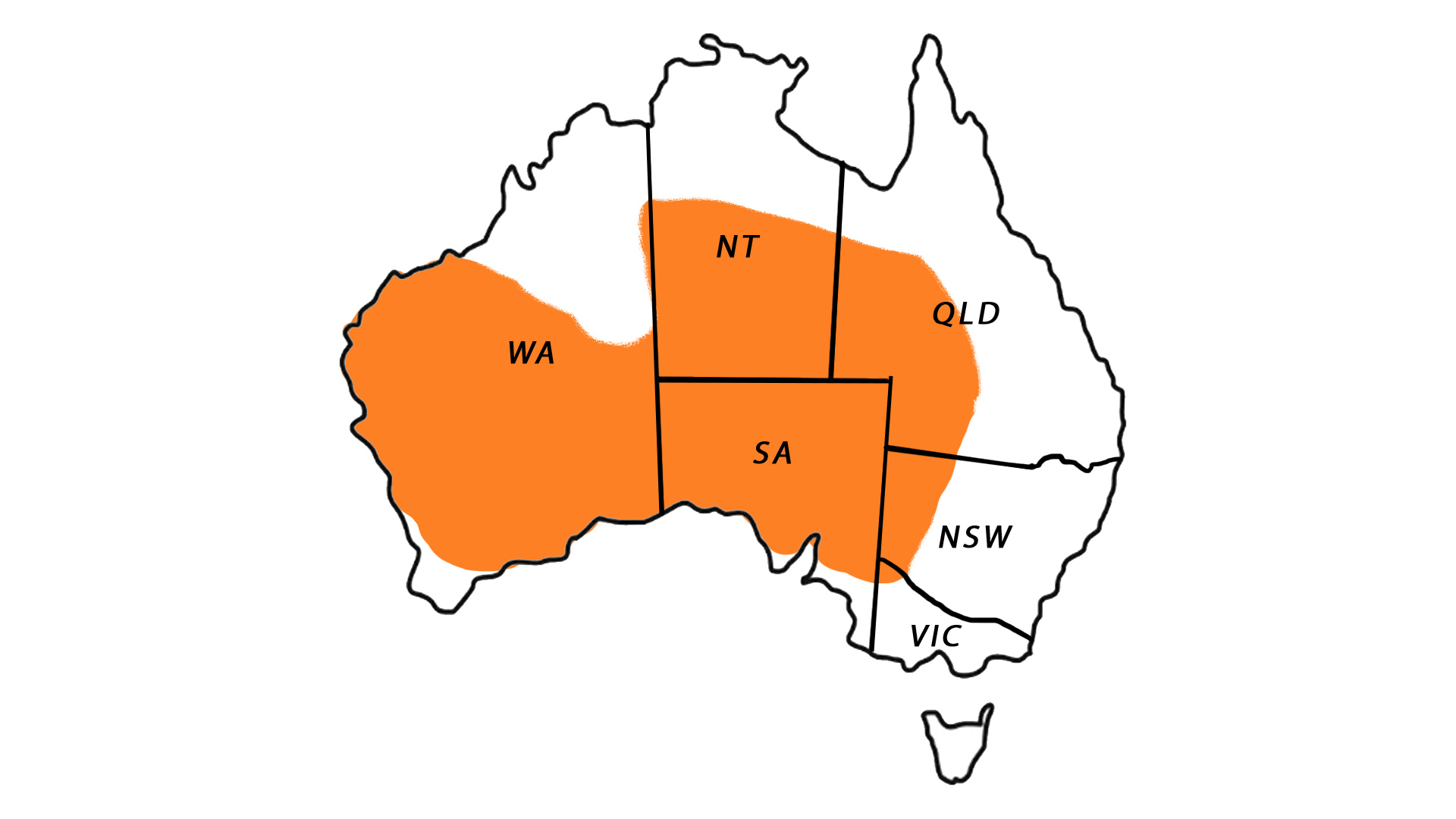
Distribution of C. schomburgkii

Ctenotus schomburgkii, the barred wedge-snout ctenotus, is a species of skink found in Australia.

Note: some lizards that were previously known as Ctenotus schomburgkii are now known as Ctenotus kutjupa.

== Description ==
A small skink (up to 5 cm (2.0 in) long), it has distinguishing orange dots along its side and brown and orange stripes on its back.

== Distribution ==
This species is found in central western New South Wales and Queensland, to South Australia and the southern half of the Northern Territory through to the southern half of Western Australia.

== Ecology ==
Ctenotus schomburgkii is an ectotherm. That is, they rely on external heat source from the environment to get what heat they require for their body temperature. They use solar radiation or conduction for their bodies heat source. (Sitting in the sun or deriving heat from a warmed rock for example).

They are very adaptive skinks and relatively unspecialised in dietary requirements so can use various habitats.

Ctenotus schomburgkii occurs in sympatry with other Ctenotus lizards, all of whom use spinifex grasses under trees. Being so adaptive they have minimal competition from inter or intra specific species.

Spinifex (Triodia and Plectrachne sp.) is of major importance to Ctenotus schomburgkii. Termite tunnels have been found in the centre of spinifex grass tussocks, linking to mounds nearby, so the grasses are excellent for termite eating lizards. In fact flourishing termite populations has been linked to high lizard population directly.

== Behaviour ==
Ctenotus schomburgkii has bimodal daily patterns, being active during the day, specifically at the start and end of the day. It forages widely. It has a longer activity time than larger lizards of the same genus.

Ctenotus schomburgkii lives over 5 years, females live longer than males and are also larger.

Breeding is over summer (Oct -Feb), they mostly lay clutches of 2 eggs but in some cases 1-3 eggs.

Ctenotus schomburgkii has a home range of 40–60 square metres (430–650 sq ft).

== Diet ==
This skink feeds mainly on termites but is considered a generalist insectivore. They also are known to eat spiders, crickets, grasshoppers and beetles.

== Predators ==
Varanus gouldi otherwise known as the sand goanna, is a large monitor that preys on and digs C. schomburgkii out of burrows in the sand.

When Ctenotus schomburgkii hides in spinifex tussocks, mammalian and avian predators cannot catch them. These are therefore not considered predators C. schomburgkii is however preyed upon by cats.

== Conservation ==
While Ctenotus schomburgkii is listed as least-concern species, when habitat is fragmented into corridors or patches of habitat the lizard population is affected. Less are found the further one moves away from distinct conservation areas. Direct corridors are not necessarily protective of this and other species.

Climate change is a risk to these species as fecundity is directly affected by temperature. This is more true for Ctenosus lizards than mammals and endotherms. Favoured vegetation growth (rainfall) is also a factor as the spinifex grasses are used for both food and shelter.
