= Ctenotus spaldingi =

Conservation status
- Least Concern (IUCN 3.1)

Scientific classification
- Kingdom: Animalia
- Phylum: Chordata
- Class: Reptilia
- Order: Squamata
- Suborder: Scinciformata
- Infraorder: Scincomorpha
- Family: Sphenomorphidae
- Genus: Ctenotus
- Species: C. spaldingi

Binomial name
- Ctenotus spaldingi (Macleay, 1877)

Species of lizard

Ctenotus spaldingi is a diurnal terrestrial skink (Scincidae) species of lizard, commonly known as the straight-browed ctenotus or Spalding's ctenotus. Native to Australia the species is found in the northern areas of Australia, along the east coast, in the north and east of South Australia and throughout Victoria and in southern Papua New Guinea. Their conservation status is of least concern classified by the IUCN. Individuals can be up to 30cm long from the snout to tail or 10cm long from the snout to vent (SVL). They typically inhabit grasslands and low vegetation in savannah woodlands in coastal dune areas, monsoon scrub and woodland commonly found around rock outcrops and when disturbed will hide in shallow burrows or amongst ground litter.

== Description ==
The Ctenotus spaldingi grows up to 30cm long from the snout to tail or can have a SVL of up to 10cm in length. The skink is mostly brown with a complex pattern of stripes and upper lateral spots consisting of white-edged back stripes running down the length of its back and tail with broad brown stripes along the sides of its body with rows of white spots. The sides become lighter, turning into an off-white color towards the underside of the skink. The species is frequently identified as the Ctenotus robustus as both species have similar descriptions and inhabit similar areas.

== Distribution and habitat ==
The species is distributed in two main populations. The northern population is located from northern New South Wales to far north Queensland and across to the northern half of the Northern Territory. The southern group is located in eastern South Australia and the western edge of New South Wales down throughout Victoria excluding the southeast of that state. The species can be found in between these locations and has been recorded in Tasmania and Papua New Guinea but are not endemic to these locations and have been spread by human transport.

The Ctenotus spaldingi inhabits among grasses and low vegetation and rock out crops in savannah woodland, grassy coastal dune, monsoon scrub and heathland. When disturbed it will typically take cover in debris on the ground or in shallow burrows to hide from predators such as feral cats or snakes that it may encounter while foraging for food.

== Diet ==
The diet of Ctenotus spaldingi has not been documented, but Ctenotus species, including the Ctenotus robustus, which is very similar to the C. spaldingi, are carnivorous, mostly feeding on available insects such as flies, crickets, grasshoppers, beetles and isopods. They can even eat other small lizards.

== Life span and reproduction ==
Ctenotus spaldingi are oviparous and reproduce by laying clutches of eggs annually. There is no formal published information on their reproductive behavior nor on how long they can live for. The species is similar to the Ctenotus robustus and it is thought they behave similarly and they inhabit similar areas.

== Conservation status ==
Declared by the IUCN the Ctenotus spaldingi's conservation status is of least concern. This is partly due to the fact that they are distributed widely across Australia. The species is under pressure from predation by feral and domestic cat and fox populations but seem to still remain present across their distribution range.
