= Ctenotus aphrodite =

Scientific classification
- Kingdom: Animalia
- Phylum: Chordata
- Class: Reptilia
- Order: Squamata
- Family: Scincidae
- Genus: Ctenotus
- Species: C. aphrodite

Binomial name
- Ctenotus aphrodite Ingram & Czechura, 1990

Species of lizard

Ctenotus aphrodite, also known commonly as the Oorida ctenotus, is a species of skink, a lizard in the family Scincidae. The species is endemic to Queensland.

== Etymology ==
The specific name, aphrodite, refers to Aphrodite, the goddess of love and beauty in Greek mythology.

== Geographic range ==
C. aphrodite is found in southwestern Queensland, Australia.

== Reproduction ==
C. aphrodite is oviparous.

== Taxonomy ==
C. aphrodite may be a synonym of C. septenarius.
