= Eastern striped skink =

Eastern striped skink may refer to:

- Ctenotus robustus in Australia
- the eastern race of Trachylepis striata in Africa
