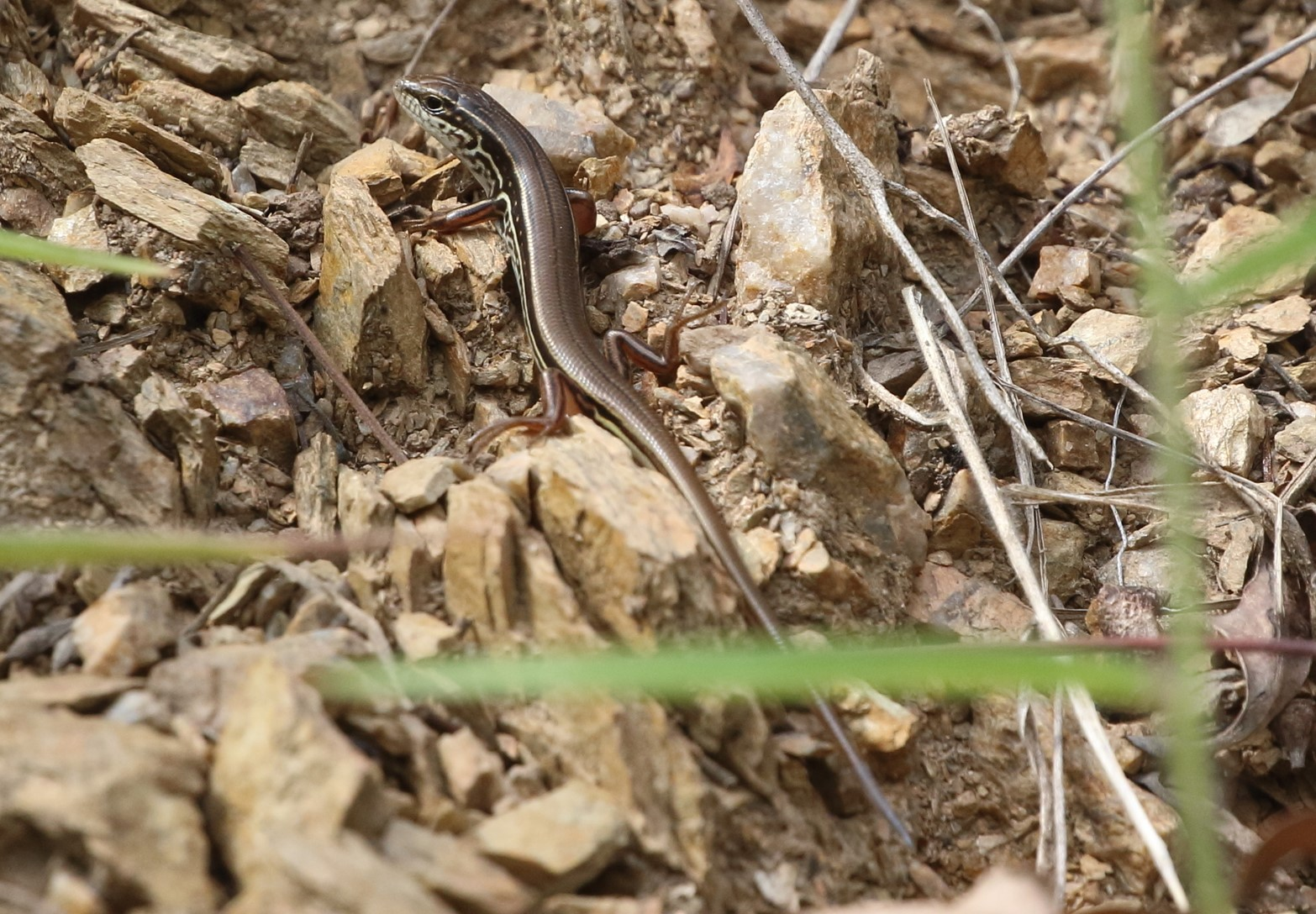

Conservation status
- Least Concern (IUCN 3.1)

Scientific classification
- Kingdom: Animalia
- Phylum: Chordata
- Class: Reptilia
- Order: Squamata
- Family: Scincidae
- Genus: Ctenotus
- Species: C. arcanus

Binomial name
- Ctenotus arcanus Czechura & Wombey, 1990

= Ctenotus arcanus =

Species of lizard

Ctenotus arcanus, the arcane ctenotus, is a species of skink found in Queensland and New South Wales in Australia.
