= Ctenotus alleni =

Conservation status
- Near Threatened (IUCN 3.1)

Scientific classification
- Kingdom: Animalia
- Phylum: Chordata
- Class: Reptilia
- Order: Squamata
- Family: Scincidae
- Genus: Ctenotus
- Species: C. alleni

Binomial name
- Ctenotus alleni Storr, 1974

Species of lizard

Ctenotus alleni, also known commonly as the Ajana ctenotus and Allen's ctenotus, is a species of lizard in the family Scincidae. The species is endemic to Western Australia.

== Etymology ==
The specific name, alleni, is in honour of Nicholas T. Allen, who collected the holotype.

== Habitat ==
The preferred natural habitats of C. alleni are savanna and shrubland.

== Reproduction ==
C. alleni is oviparous.
