= Coastal plains skink =

Conservation status
- Vulnerable (IUCN 3.1)

Scientific classification
- Kingdom: Animalia
- Phylum: Chordata
- Class: Reptilia
- Order: Squamata
- Family: Scincidae
- Genus: Ctenotus
- Species: C. ora

Binomial name
- Ctenotus ora Kay & Keogh, 2012

Species of lizard

The coastal plains skink (Ctenotus ora) is a species of skinks, found on the Swan Coastal Plain south of Perth, Western Australia.

== Taxonomy ==
The species was identified in 2012 by researchers from Australian National University, who were conducting a survey of biological diversity in South-western Australia. They identified Ctenotus ora as a distinct species and sister taxon to the threatened Lancelin Island skink (Ctenotus lancelini).

The binomial name Ctenotus ora is derived from the genus name Ctenotus meaning "comb-ear", and the Latin ora meaning "coast", "seaside" or "shore"—referring to the species' coastal distribution.

== Distribution ==
The coastal plains skink has only been found in low numbers in a small stretch of sand dunes on the Swan Coastal Plain south of Perth, Western Australia, between Dunsborough and Mandurah. The species is threatened by residential development around the Perth coastal area, with the Zootaxa paper which described the species recommending it be considered for immediate conservation attention.

== Description ==
The common plains skink is around 6 centimetres (2.4 in) in length from snout to vent. It is dark in colour, with a continuous white dorsolateral stripe.
