= Ctenotus ehmanni =

Conservation status
- Least Concern (IUCN 3.1)

Scientific classification
- Kingdom: Animalia
- Phylum: Chordata
- Class: Reptilia
- Order: Squamata
- Family: Scincidae
- Genus: Ctenotus
- Species: C. ehmanni

Binomial name
- Ctenotus ehmanni Storr, 1985

Species of lizard

Ctenotus ehmanni, also known commonly as the brown-tailed finesnout ctenotus or Ehmann's ctenotus, is a species of skink that is endemic to the Kimberley region of Western Australia.

== Etymology ==
The specific name, ehmanni, is in honor of Australian herpetologist Harry Ehmann.

== Habitat ==
The preferred natural habitat of C. ehmanni is forest.

== Reproduction ==
C. ehmanni is oviparous.
