= Ctenotus brachyonyx =

Conservation status
- Least Concern (IUCN 3.1)

Scientific classification
- Kingdom: Animalia
- Phylum: Chordata
- Class: Reptilia
- Order: Squamata
- Family: Scincidae
- Genus: Ctenotus
- Species: C. brachyonyx

Binomial name
- Ctenotus brachyonyx (Storr, 1971)

Species of lizard

Ctenotus brachyonyx, the short-clawed ctenotus, is a species of skink found in New South Wales, South Australia, and Victoria.
