= Ctenotus greeri =

Conservation status
- Least Concern (IUCN 3.1)

Scientific classification
- Kingdom: Animalia
- Phylum: Chordata
- Class: Reptilia
- Order: Squamata
- Family: Scincidae
- Genus: Ctenotus
- Species: C. greeri

Binomial name
- Ctenotus greeri Storr, 1979

Species of lizard

Ctenotus greeri, also known commonly as Greer's ctenotus or the spotted-necked ctenotus, is a species of skink endemic to Australia.

== Etymology ==
The specific name, greeri, is in honour of Australian herpetologist Allen Eddy Greer.

== Geographic range ==
C. greeri is found in the Australian states of South Australia and Western Australia, as well as in the Northern Territory.

== Habitat ==
The preferred natural habitats of C. greeri are grassland and shrubland.

== Description ==
C. greeri has five toes on each of its four feet.

== Reproduction ==
C. greeri is oviparous.
