= Ctenotus hanloni =

Conservation status
- Least Concern (IUCN 3.1)

Scientific classification
- Kingdom: Animalia
- Phylum: Chordata
- Class: Reptilia
- Order: Squamata
- Family: Scincidae
- Genus: Ctenotus
- Species: C. hanloni

Binomial name
- Ctenotus hanloni Storr, 1980

Species of lizard

Ctenotus hanloni, also known commonly as Hanlon's ctenotus and the nimble ctenotus, is a species of skink endemic to Australia.

== Etymology ==
The specific name, hanloni, is in honor of Australian herpetologist Timothy Marcus Stephen "Mark" Hanlon.

== Geographic range ==
C. hanloni is found in the Australian states of South Australia and Western Australia, as well as in the Northern Territory.

== Habitat ==
The preferred natural habitat of C. hanloni is grassland.

== Description ==
C. hanloni has an average snout-to-vent length (SVL) of 5.25 cm (2.07 in).

== Reproduction ==
C. hanloni is oviparous.
