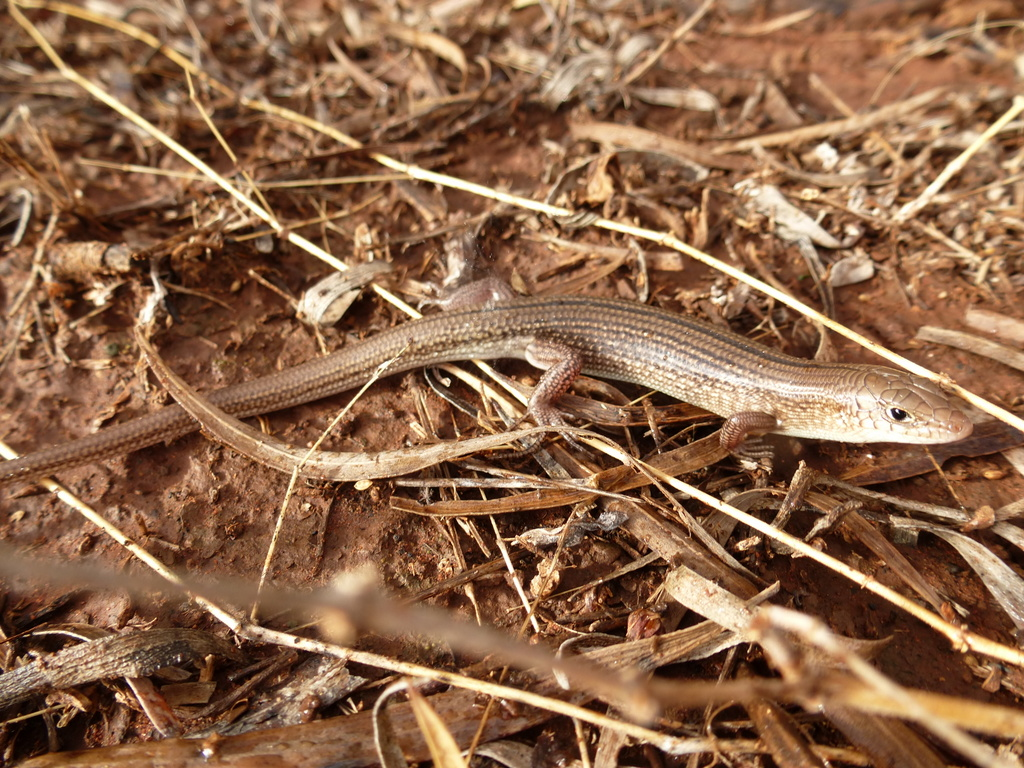

Conservation status
- Least Concern (IUCN 3.1)

Scientific classification
- Kingdom: Animalia
- Phylum: Chordata
- Class: Reptilia
- Order: Squamata
- Family: Scincidae
- Genus: Ctenotus
- Species: C. helenae

Binomial name
- Ctenotus helenae (Storr, 1969)
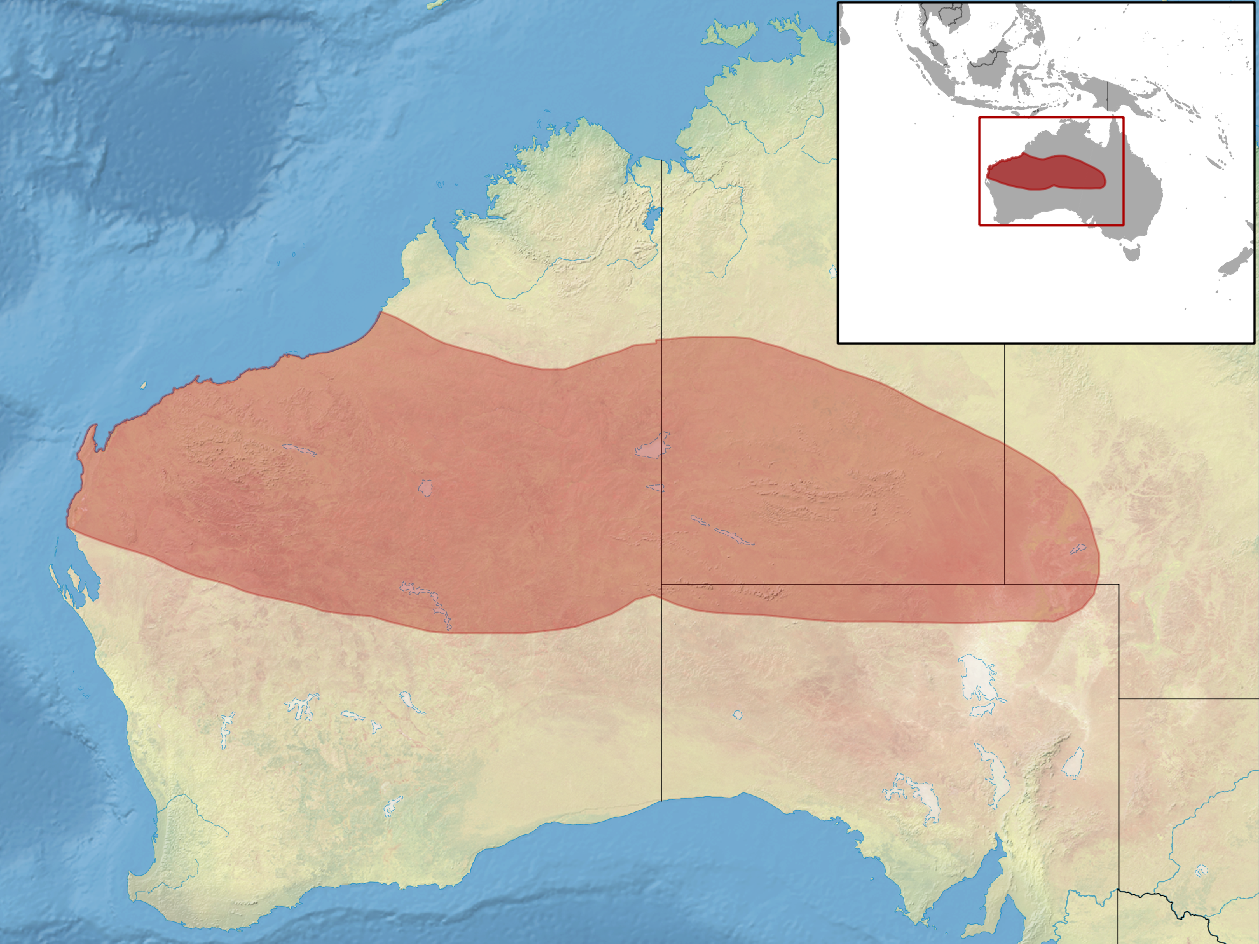

Synonyms
- Lygosoma lesueurii concolor Glauert, 1952

= Ctenotus helenae =

Species of lizard

Ctenotus helenae, also known commonly as the clay-soil ctenotus, is a species of skink endemic to Australia.

== Etymology ==
The specific name, helenae, is in honour of Helen Louise Pianka who was married to American herpetologist Eric R. Pianka.

== Geographic range ==
Within Australia, C. helenae is found in the Northern Territory, Queensland, South Australia, and Western Australia.

== Habitat ==
C. helenae is found in wide variety of habitats including forest, shrubland, grassland, and desert.

== Behaviour ==
C. helenae is terrestrial and diurnal.

== Reproduction ==
C. helenae is oviparous.
