= Ctenotus striaticeps =

Conservation status
- Least Concern (IUCN 3.1)

Scientific classification
- Kingdom: Animalia
- Phylum: Chordata
- Class: Reptilia
- Order: Squamata
- Suborder: Scinciformata
- Infraorder: Scincomorpha
- Family: Sphenomorphidae
- Genus: Ctenotus
- Species: C. striaticeps

Binomial name
- Ctenotus striaticeps Storr, 1978

Species of lizard

Ctenotus striaticeps, the stripe-headed finesnout ctenotus, is a species of skink found in the Northern Territory and Queensland in Australia.
