= Ctenotus decaneurus =

Conservation status
- Least Concern (IUCN 3.1)

Scientific classification
- Kingdom: Animalia
- Phylum: Chordata
- Class: Reptilia
- Order: Squamata
- Family: Scincidae
- Genus: Ctenotus
- Species: C. decaneurus

Binomial name
- Ctenotus decaneurus Storr, 1970

Species of lizard

Ctenotus decaneurus, also known as the ten-lined ctenotus, is an Australian species of skink native to the Northern Territory, Queensland and Western Australia.
