= Ctenotus fallens =

Conservation status
- Least Concern (IUCN 3.1)

Scientific classification
- Kingdom: Animalia
- Phylum: Chordata
- Class: Reptilia
- Order: Squamata
- Family: Scincidae
- Genus: Ctenotus
- Species: C. fallens

Binomial name
- Ctenotus fallens (Storr, 1974)

Species of lizard

Ctenotus fallens, the West-coast laterite ctenotus, is a species of skink found in Western Australia.
