= Hamelin ctenotus =

Conservation status
- Near Threatened (IUCN 3.1)

Scientific classification
- Kingdom: Animalia
- Phylum: Chordata
- Class: Reptilia
- Order: Squamata
- Suborder: Scinciformata
- Infraorder: Scincomorpha
- Family: Sphenomorphidae
- Genus: Ctenotus
- Species: C. zastictus

Binomial name
- Ctenotus zastictus Storr, 1984

Species of lizard

The Hamelin ctenotus or Hamelin Pool ctenotus (Ctenotus zastictus) is a species of skink in the family Scincidae. It is found only in Western Australia.
