= Ctenotus tantillus =

Conservation status
- Least Concern (IUCN 3.1)

Scientific classification
- Kingdom: Animalia
- Phylum: Chordata
- Class: Reptilia
- Order: Squamata
- Family: Scincidae
- Genus: Ctenotus
- Species: C. tantillus

Binomial name
- Ctenotus tantillus Storr, 1975

Species of lizard

Ctenotus tantillus, the Kimberley wedge-snout ctenotus, is a species of skink found in the Northern Territory and Western Australia.

== External link ==
External image
- https://www.flickr.com/photos/27897324@N07/51233773599/ A photograph of Ctenotus tantillus on Flickr
