= Ctenotus gagudju =

Conservation status
- Least Concern (IUCN 3.1)

Scientific classification
- Kingdom: Animalia
- Phylum: Chordata
- Class: Reptilia
- Order: Squamata
- Family: Scincidae
- Genus: Ctenotus
- Species: C. gagudju

Binomial name
- Ctenotus gagudju Sadlier, Wombey, & Braithwaite, 1986
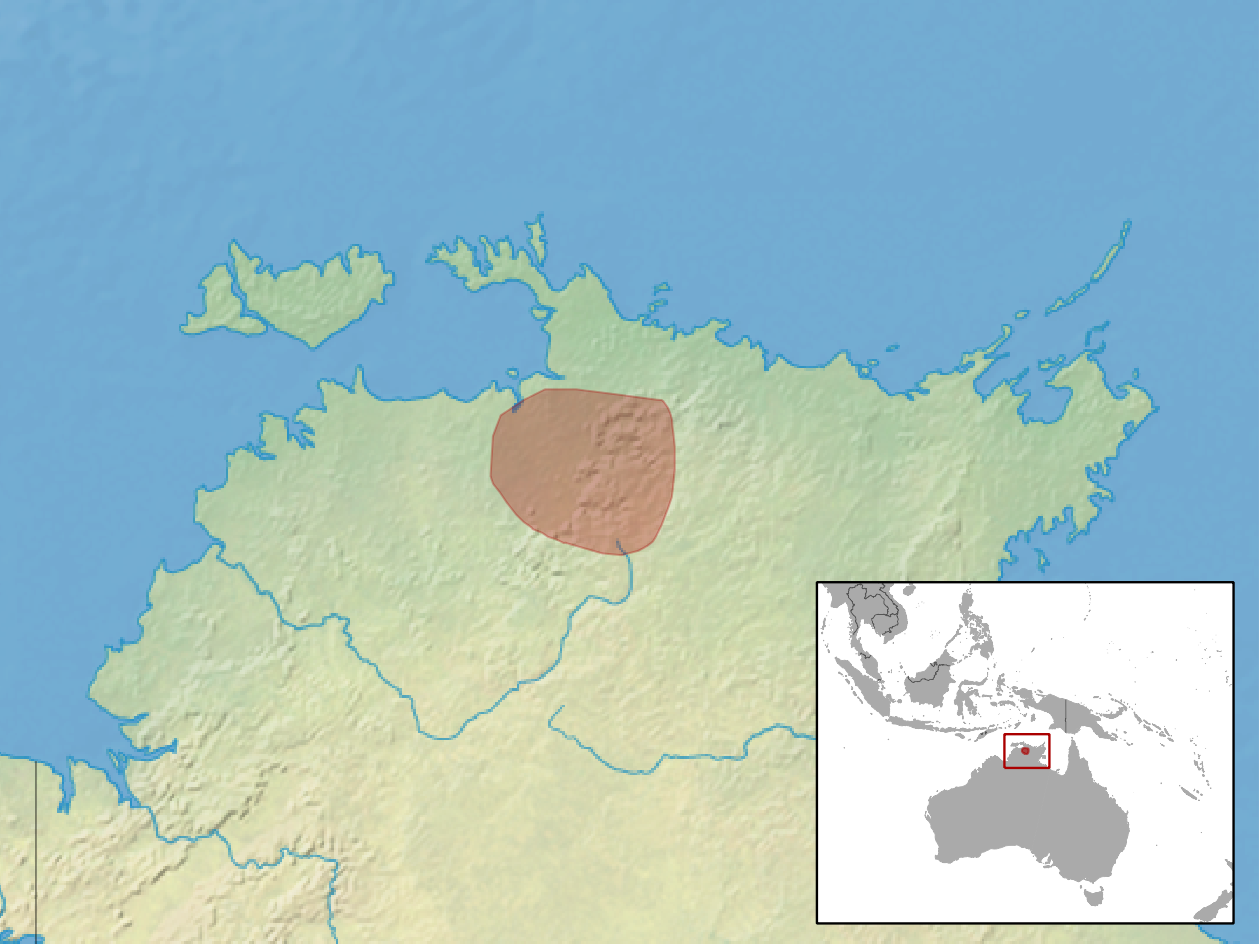

Species of lizard

Ctenotus gagudju, the Magela ctenotus or Kakadu ctenotus, is a species of skink found in the Northern Territory in Australia.
