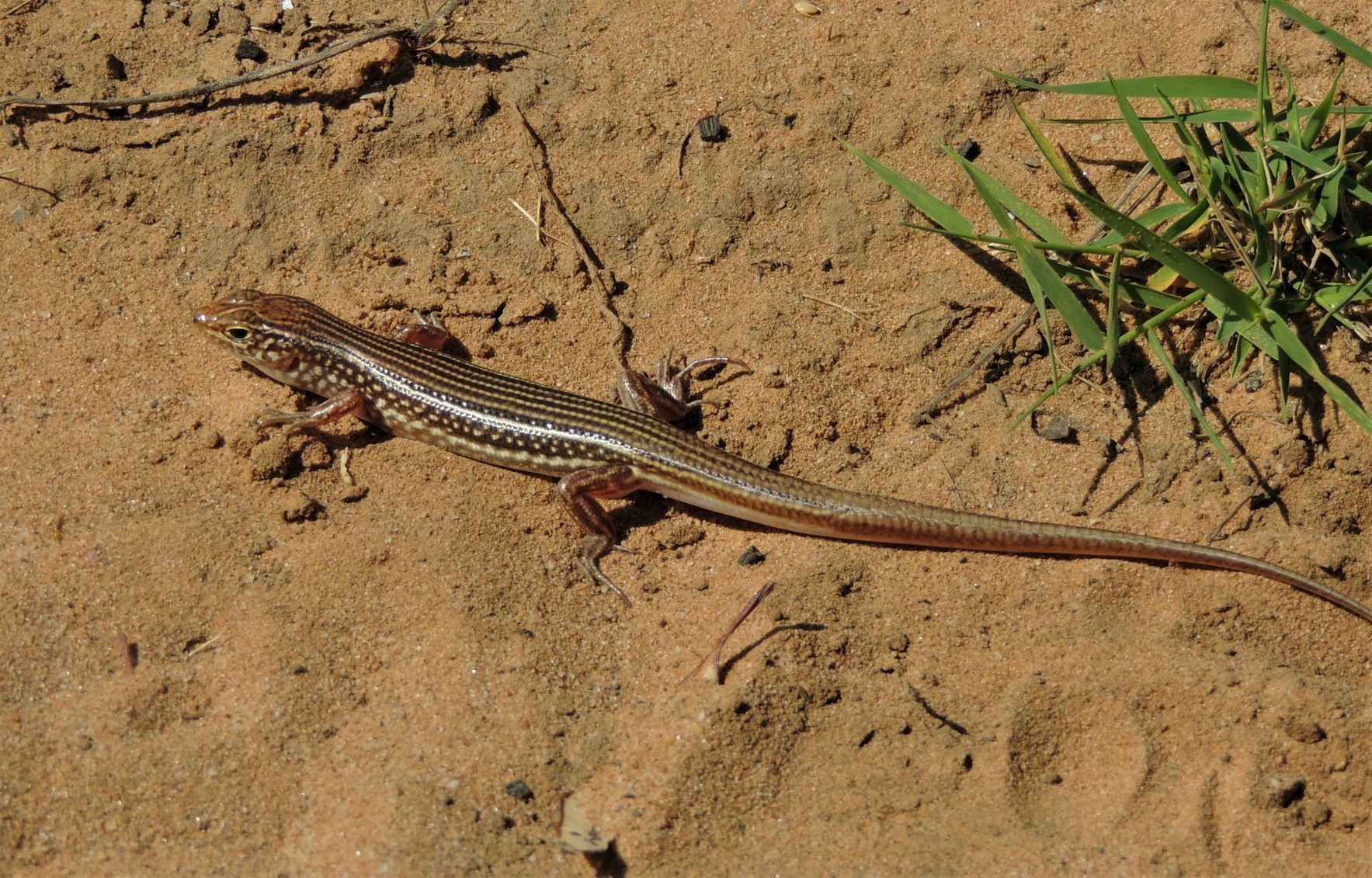

Conservation status
- Least Concern (IUCN 3.1)

Scientific classification
- Kingdom: Animalia
- Phylum: Chordata
- Class: Reptilia
- Order: Squamata
- Family: Scincidae
- Genus: Ctenotus
- Species: C. hebetior

Binomial name
- Ctenotus hebetior Storr, 1978

= Ctenotus hebetior =

Species of lizard

Ctenotus hebetior, known commonly as the stout ctenotus, is an Australian species of skink endemic to Queensland.
