= Ctenotus eurydice =

Conservation status
- Least Concern (IUCN 3.1)

Scientific classification
- Kingdom: Animalia
- Phylum: Chordata
- Class: Reptilia
- Order: Squamata
- Family: Scincidae
- Genus: Ctenotus
- Species: C. eurydice

Binomial name
- Ctenotus eurydice Czechura & Wombey, 1982

Species of lizard

Ctenotus eurydice, also known commonly as the brown-backed yellow-lined ctenotus, is a species of skink, a lizard in the family Scincidae. The species is native to New South Wales and Queensland in Australia.

== Etymology ==
The specific name, eurydice, refers to the Greek mythological character Eurydice, wife of Orpheus.

== Habitat ==
The preferred natural habitat of C. eurydice is rocky areas.

== Description ==
C. eurydice has well-developed limbs, with five toes on each of its four feet.

== Reproduction ==
C. eurydice is oviparous.
