= Ctenotus serotinus =

Conservation status
- Critically Endangered (IUCN 3.1)

Scientific classification
- Kingdom: Animalia
- Phylum: Chordata
- Class: Reptilia
- Order: Squamata
- Suborder: Scinciformata
- Infraorder: Scincomorpha
- Family: Sphenomorphidae
- Genus: Ctenotus
- Species: C. serotinus

Binomial name
- Ctenotus serotinus Czechura, 1986

Species of lizard

Ctenotus serotinus, the gravel-downs ctenotus, is a species of skink found in Queensland in Australia.
