= Ctenotus lateralis =

Conservation status
- Least Concern (IUCN 3.1)

Scientific classification
- Kingdom: Animalia
- Phylum: Chordata
- Class: Reptilia
- Order: Squamata
- Family: Scincidae
- Genus: Ctenotus
- Species: C. lateralis

Binomial name
- Ctenotus lateralis Storr, 1978

Species of lizard

Ctenotus lateralis, known commonly as the gravelly-soil ctenotus, is a species of skink native to Queensland and the Northern Territory.
