= Ctenotus quattuordecimlineatus =

Conservation status
- Least Concern (IUCN 3.1)

Scientific classification
- Kingdom: Animalia
- Phylum: Chordata
- Class: Reptilia
- Order: Squamata
- Suborder: Scinciformata
- Infraorder: Scincomorpha
- Family: Sphenomorphidae
- Genus: Ctenotus
- Species: C. quattuordecimlineatus

Binomial name
- Ctenotus quattuordecimlineatus (Sternfeld, 1919)

Species of lizard

Ctenotus quattuordecimlineatus, the fourteen-lined ctenotus, is a species of skink found in Australia.
