= Ctenotus pallescens =

Conservation status
- Least Concern (IUCN 3.1)

Scientific classification
- Kingdom: Animalia
- Phylum: Chordata
- Class: Reptilia
- Order: Squamata
- Suborder: Scinciformata
- Infraorder: Scincomorpha
- Family: Sphenomorphidae
- Genus: Ctenotus
- Species: C. pallescens

Binomial name
- Ctenotus pallescens Storr, 1970

Species of lizard

Ctenotus pallescens, the north-western wedgesnout ctenotus, is a species of skink found in the Northern Territory in Australia.
