= Ctenotus angusticeps =

Conservation status
- Least Concern (IUCN 3.1)

Scientific classification
- Kingdom: Animalia
- Phylum: Chordata
- Class: Reptilia
- Order: Squamata
- Family: Scincidae
- Genus: Ctenotus
- Species: C. angusticeps

Binomial name
- Ctenotus angusticeps Storr, 1988

Species of lizard

Ctenotus angusticeps, the northwestern coastal ctenotus, little leopard ctenotus, or Airlie Island ctenuous, is a species of skink endemic to Western Australia.
