= Ctenotus calurus =

Conservation status
- Least Concern (IUCN 3.1)

Scientific classification
- Kingdom: Animalia
- Phylum: Chordata
- Class: Reptilia
- Order: Squamata
- Family: Scincidae
- Genus: Ctenotus
- Species: C. calurus

Binomial name
- Ctenotus calurus Storr, 1969

Species of lizard

Ctenotus calurus, known commonly as the blue-tailed finesnout ctenotus, is an Australian species of skink native to the Northern Territory, Queensland, South Australia, and Western Australia.
