= Ctenotus maryani =

Conservation status
- Least Concern (IUCN 3.1)

Scientific classification
- Kingdom: Animalia
- Phylum: Chordata
- Class: Reptilia
- Order: Squamata
- Family: Scincidae
- Genus: Ctenotus
- Species: C. maryani

Binomial name
- Ctenotus maryani Aplin & Adams, 1998

Species of lizard

Ctenotus maryani, also known commonly as Maryan's ctenotus, is a species of lizard in the subfamily Sphenomorphinae of the family Scincidae (skinks). The species is endemic to the state of Western Australia.

== Etymology ==
The specific name, maryani, is in honour of Australian herpetologist Brad Maryan.

== Description ==
Medium-sized for its genus, Ctenotus maryani may attain a snout-to-vent length (SVL) of 5.4 cm (2.1 in). Dorsally, it is dark reddish brown, with a simple pattern of 12 pale stripes which do not extend onto the head.

== Habitat ==
The preferred natural habitats of Ctenotus maryani are grassland and desert.

== Reproduction ==
Ctenotus maryani is oviparous.
