= Ctenotus storri =

Conservation status
- Least Concern (IUCN 3.1)

Scientific classification
- Kingdom: Animalia
- Phylum: Chordata
- Class: Reptilia
- Order: Squamata
- Family: Scincidae
- Genus: Ctenotus
- Species: C. storri

Binomial name
- Ctenotus storri Rankin, 1978

Species of lizard

Ctenotus storri, also known commonly as the buff-striped ctenotus or Storr's ctenotus, is a species of lizard in the family Scincidae. The species is endemic to Australia.

== Etymology ==
The specific name, storri, is in honour of Australian herpetologist Glen Milton Storr.

== Geographic range ==
C. storri is found in the Northern Territory in Australia.

== Habitat ==
The preferred natural habitats of C. storri are grassland and savanna.

== Reproduction ==
C. storri is oviparous.
