= Ctenotus quirinus =

Conservation status
- Least Concern (IUCN 3.1)

Scientific classification
- Kingdom: Animalia
- Phylum: Chordata
- Class: Reptilia
- Order: Squamata
- Suborder: Scinciformata
- Infraorder: Scincomorpha
- Family: Sphenomorphidae
- Genus: Ctenotus
- Species: C. quirinus

Binomial name
- Ctenotus quirinus Horner, 2007

Species of lizard

Ctenotus quirinus, the Arnhem Land ctenotus, is a species of skink found in Northern Territory in Australia.
