= Ctenotus ariadnae =

Conservation status
- Least Concern (IUCN 3.1)

Scientific classification
- Kingdom: Animalia
- Phylum: Chordata
- Class: Reptilia
- Order: Squamata
- Family: Scincidae
- Genus: Ctenotus
- Species: C. ariadnae

Binomial name
- Ctenotus ariadnae Storr, 1969

Species of lizard

Ctenotus ariadnae, also known commonly as Ariadna's ctenotus, is a species of skink, a lizard in the family Scincidae. The species is endemic to Australia.

== Etymology ==
The specific name, ariadnae, is in honor of Ariadna Neumann who was the Librarian of the Western Australian Museum.

== Geographic range ==
C. ariadnae is found in central Australia, in the following portions of the Australian states and territories: eastern Western Australia, northern South Australia, southwestern Queensland, and southern Northern Territory.

== Habitat ==
The preferred natural habitats of C. ariadne are desert and grassland.

== Description ==
C. ariadnae has an average snout-to-vent length (SVL) of about 5 cm (2.0 in), and a tail about 1.75 times SVL.

== Diet ==
C. ariadnae preys mainly on termites, but also on other insects and spiders.

== Reproduction ==
C. ariadnae is oviparous.
