= Ctenotus youngsoni =

Conservation status
- Least Concern (IUCN 3.1)

Scientific classification
- Kingdom: Animalia
- Phylum: Chordata
- Class: Reptilia
- Order: Squamata
- Family: Scincidae
- Genus: Ctenotus
- Species: C. youngsoni

Binomial name
- Ctenotus youngsoni Storr, 1975

Species of lizard

Ctenotus youngsoni, also known commonly as the Shark Bay south-west ctenotus and Youngson's ctenotus, is a species of skink, a lizard in the family Scincidae. The species is endemic to Australia. The specific name, youngsoni, is in honour of Australian zoologist William Kenneth Youngson. C. youngsoni is found in the Australian state of Western Australia. The preferred natural habitat of C. youngsoni is shrubland. C. youngsoni has well-developed limbs, with five toes on each of its four feet. C. youngsoni is oviparous.
