= Ctenotus ingrami =

Conservation status
- Least Concern (IUCN 3.1)

Scientific classification
- Kingdom: Animalia
- Phylum: Chordata
- Class: Reptilia
- Order: Squamata
- Family: Scincidae
- Genus: Ctenotus
- Species: C. ingrami

Binomial name
- Ctenotus ingrami Czechura & Wombey, 1982

Species of lizard

Ctenotus ingrami, also known commonly as Ingram's ctenotus and the unspotted yellow-sided ctenotus, is an Australian species of skink found in Queensland and New South Wales.

== Etymology ==
The specific name, ingrami, is in honor of Australian herpetologist Glen Joseph Ingram.

== Habitat ==
The preferred natural habitat of C. ingrami is forest.

== Description ==
C. ingrami has five digits on each of its four feet. Moderately large for its genus, average snout-to-vent length (SVL) is 6.5 cm (2.6 in), and maximum recorded SVL is 8.4 cm (3.3 in).

== Behavior ==
C. ingrami is terrestrial.

== Reproduction ==
C. ingrami is oviparous.
