= Ctenotus catenifer =

Conservation status
- Least Concern (IUCN 3.1)

Scientific classification
- Kingdom: Animalia
- Phylum: Chordata
- Class: Reptilia
- Order: Squamata
- Family: Scincidae
- Genus: Ctenotus
- Species: C. catenifer

Binomial name
- Ctenotus catenifer Storr, 1974

Species of lizard

Ctenotus catenifer, also known as the chain-striped south-west ctenotus, is a species of skink endemic to Western Australia.
