= Ctenotus serventyi =

Conservation status
- Least Concern (IUCN 3.1)

Scientific classification
- Kingdom: Animalia
- Phylum: Chordata
- Class: Reptilia
- Order: Squamata
- Suborder: Scinciformata
- Infraorder: Scincomorpha
- Family: Sphenomorphidae
- Genus: Ctenotus
- Species: C. serventyi

Binomial name
- Ctenotus serventyi Storr, 1975

Species of lizard

Ctenotus serventyi, the north-western sandy-loam ctenotus, is a species of skink found in Western Australia.
