= Ctenotus xenopleura =

Conservation status
- Least Concern (IUCN 3.1)

Scientific classification
- Kingdom: Animalia
- Phylum: Chordata
- Class: Reptilia
- Order: Squamata
- Suborder: Scinciformata
- Infraorder: Scincomorpha
- Family: Sphenomorphidae
- Genus: Ctenotus
- Species: C. xenopleura

Binomial name
- Ctenotus xenopleura Storr, 1981

Species of lizard

Ctenotus xenopleura, the wide-striped ctenotus, is a species of skink found in Western Australia.
