= Ctenotus gemmula =

Conservation status
- Least Concern (IUCN 3.1)

Scientific classification
- Kingdom: Animalia
- Phylum: Chordata
- Class: Reptilia
- Order: Squamata
- Family: Scincidae
- Genus: Ctenotus
- Species: C. gemmula

Binomial name
- Ctenotus gemmula Storr, 1974
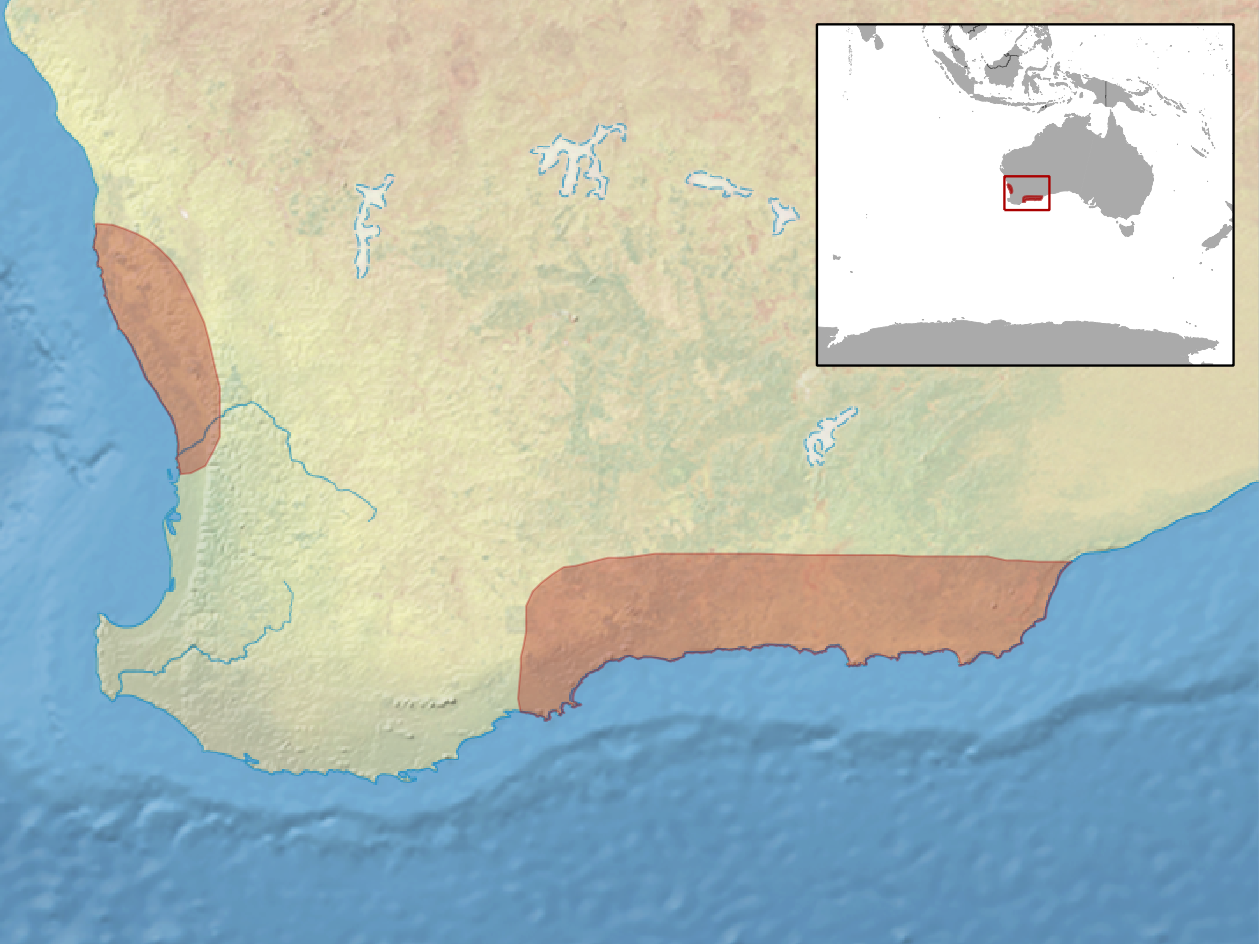

Species of lizard

Ctenotus gemmula, the jewelled south-west ctenotus, is a species of skink found in Western Australia.
