= Ctenotus quinkan =

Conservation status
- Least Concern (IUCN 3.1)

Scientific classification
- Kingdom: Animalia
- Phylum: Chordata
- Class: Reptilia
- Order: Squamata
- Family: Scincidae
- Genus: Ctenotus
- Species: C. quinkan

Binomial name
- Ctenotus quinkan Ingram, 1979

Species of lizard

Ctenotus quinkan, the Quinkan ctenotus, is a species of Australian skink, a lizard in the family Scincidae.

== Description ==
The skink is olive-brown in colour with an average Snout-Vent length of 55 to 80 mm (2.2 to 3.1 in).

== Taxonomy ==
The species was first formally described by Glen Ingram in 1979.

== Distribution ==
The species is endemic to the area around Cooktown in Queensland in Australia. It has only been recorded in the sandstone escarpments of the Cooktown-Laura area.

== Publications ==
- Ingram, 1979 : Two new species of skinks, genus Ctenotus (Reptilia, Lacertilia, Scincidae), from Cape York Peninsula, Queensland, Australia. Journal of Herpetology, vol. 13, No. 3, p. 279-282.
