= Ctenotus stuarti =

Conservation status
- Endangered (IUCN 3.1)

Scientific classification
- Kingdom: Animalia
- Phylum: Chordata
- Class: Reptilia
- Order: Squamata
- Family: Scincidae
- Genus: Ctenotus
- Species: C. stuarti

Binomial name
- Ctenotus stuarti Horner, 1995

Species of lizard

Ctenotus stuarti, also known commonly as the Point Stuart ctenotus or Stuart's ctenotus, is a species of skink, a lizard in the family Scincidae. The species is endemic to Australia.

== Etymology ==
The specific name, stuarti, is in honor of Scottish explorer John McDouall Stuart, and also refers to the locality Point Stuart.

== Geographic range ==
C. stuarti found in the Northern Territory in Australia.

== Habitat ==
The preferred natural habitat of C. stuarti is forest.

== Reproduction ==
C. stuarti is oviparous.
