= Ctenotus rawlinsoni =

Conservation status
- Least Concern (IUCN 3.1)

Scientific classification
- Kingdom: Animalia
- Phylum: Chordata
- Class: Reptilia
- Order: Squamata
- Suborder: Scinciformata
- Infraorder: Scincomorpha
- Family: Sphenomorphidae
- Genus: Ctenotus
- Species: C. rawlinsoni

Binomial name
- Ctenotus rawlinsoni Ingram, 1979

Species of lizard

Ctenotus rawlinsoni, the Cape Heath ctenotus, is a species of skink found in Queensland in Australia.
