= Ctenotus rubicundus =

Conservation status
- Least Concern (IUCN 3.1)

Scientific classification
- Kingdom: Animalia
- Phylum: Chordata
- Class: Reptilia
- Order: Squamata
- Suborder: Scinciformata
- Infraorder: Scincomorpha
- Family: Sphenomorphidae
- Genus: Ctenotus
- Species: C. rubicundus

Binomial name
- Ctenotus rubicundus Storr, 1978

Species of lizard

Ctenotus rubicundus, the ruddy ctenotus, is a species of skink found in Western Australia.
