= Ctenotus brevipes =

Conservation status
- Least Concern (IUCN 3.1)

Scientific classification
- Kingdom: Animalia
- Phylum: Chordata
- Class: Reptilia
- Order: Squamata
- Family: Scincidae
- Genus: Ctenotus
- Species: C. brevipes

Binomial name
- Ctenotus brevipes Storr, 1981

Species of lizard

Ctenotus brevipes, known commonly as the short-footed ctenotus, is an Australian species of skink native to Queensland and the Northern Territory.
