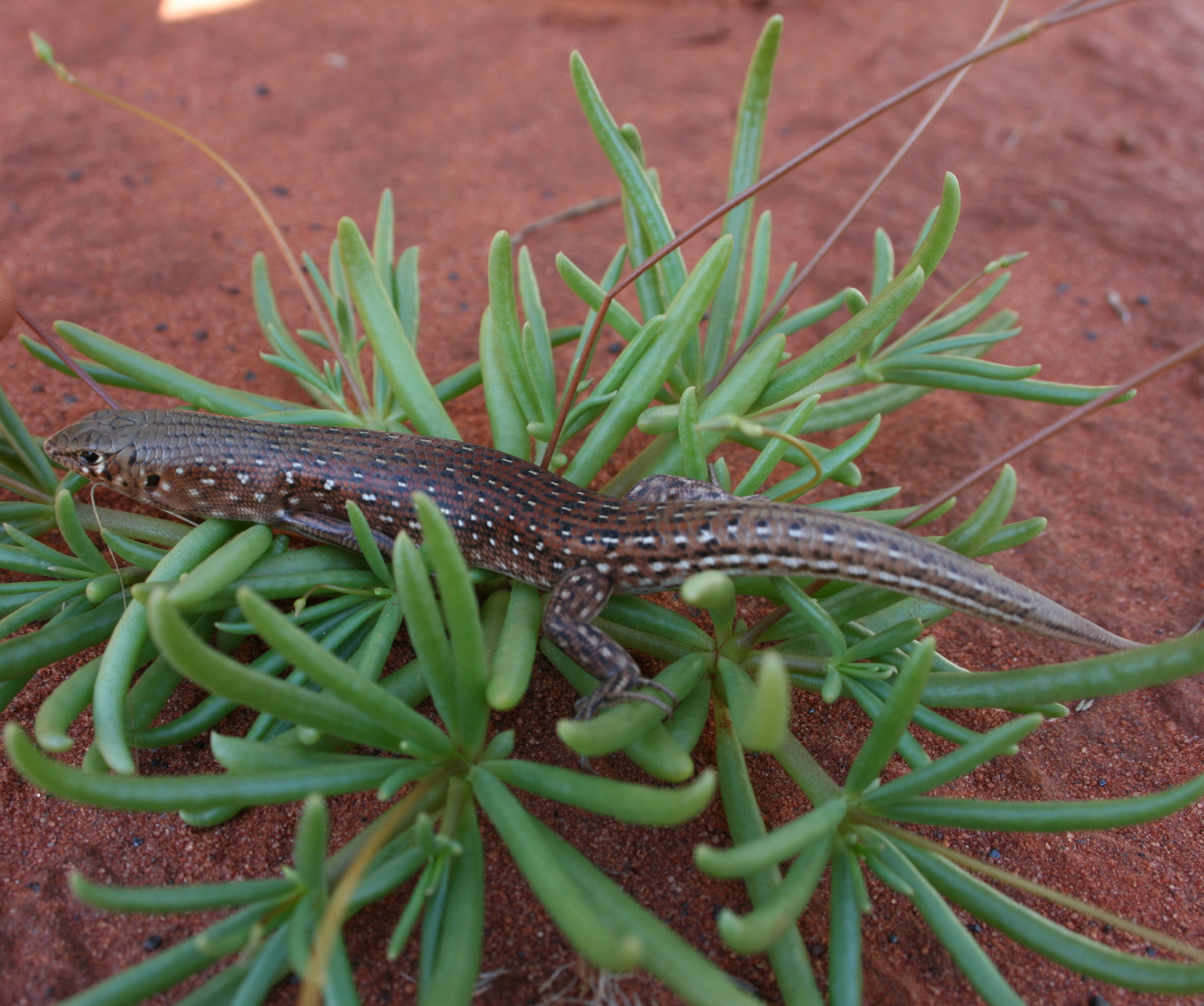
- Ctenotus pantherinus ocellifer

Conservation status
- Least Concern (IUCN 3.1)

Scientific classification
- Kingdom: Animalia
- Phylum: Chordata
- Class: Reptilia
- Order: Squamata
- Family: Scincidae
- Genus: Ctenotus
- Species: C. pantherinus

Binomial name
- Ctenotus pantherinus (Peters, 1866)

Synonyms
- Lygosoma pantherinum Peters, 1866; Egernia whitei carnarae Kinghorn, 1931; Lygosoma breviunguis Kinghorn, 1932

= Ctenotus pantherinus =

Leopard ctenotus

Species of lizard

Ctenotus pantherinus, commonly known as the leopard ctenotus, is a species of skink endemic to central and western Australia. Its conservation status is currently classified as Least Concern.

== Description ==
They are a brown/grey lizard with a tail almost equal to its body length, with short, four stubby legs of similar length, ending in clawed feet with five digits. Yellow/white spots with a black/brown outline begin behind the head and extend to the tip of the tail. Some adult leopard ctenotus have white/yellow stripes on the side of the tail, starting at the hind leg. The underbelly is a pale white/yellow colour.

Leopard ctenotus are one of the largest and fastest growing Ctenotus species in Australia. They grow more during winter than other Ctenotus species and are active during all seasons. Males tend to grow at a slightly faster rate than females, and juveniles born in autumn grow faster over winter than those born in the summer months.

== Distribution ==
Ctenotus pantherinus is endemic to Australia and has been found in the semi- arid and arid regions of Western Australia, Northern Territory, Queensland, New South Wales and South Australia.

== Ecology and habitat ==
Ctenotus pantherinus inhabits semi-arid and arid regions of Australia which are usually sandy and stony areas high in Spinifex grasses. Hatchlings are 33 mm (1.3 in) long and can grow up to 86 mm (3.4 in) (snout to vent length) as a mature adult.

=== Diet ===
Ctenotus pantherinus are insectivores, their diet almost entirely consists of consuming termites and their larvae.

== Taxonomy ==
The leopard ctenotus is a species of lizard, which belongs to the genus Ctenotus. Ctenotus are in the family Scincidae, which contains more than 1,500 described species, making the Scincidae family one of the most diverse lizard families on Earth.

== Subspecies ==
Ctenotus pantherinus has four subspecies:

- Ctenotus pantherinus pantherinus
- C. p. acripes
- C. p. calx
- C. p. ocellifer

== Reproduction ==
Leopard ctenotus are oviparious, meaning they lay eggs which hatch after some time. Leopard Ctenotus reproduce at least once per year, and can have a clutch size ranging from 4-7 eggs. Egg production usually occurs in late spring to early summer.

Reproductive rate is above average when compared with other Ctenotus species inhabiting the same area, with a relatively large clutch size compared to other skink species. Juvenile leopard ctenotus reach sexual maturity at 10–11 months of age, on average.

Ctenotus pantherinus is commonly known to reproductively be the only species (within the Ctenotus genus) to have a female be smaller in size in comparison to their male counterparts. This has allowed them to both adequately adapt to their environment, as well as seen them sustain their population.

== Threats ==
This species is classified as having a conservation status of least concern; however, some threats do exist. Drought impacts food availability and this can lead to population decline in dry years. Habitat fragmentation and degradation from land clearing, poor fire regimes and over grazing may increase the isolation of populations and disrupt the ecological balance of the habitat they exist in. Predation by introduced feral animal species such as foxes and feral cats may reduce leopard ctenotus populations to low levels.
