= Ctenotus astictus =

Conservation status
- Least Concern (IUCN 3.1)

Scientific classification
- Kingdom: Animalia
- Phylum: Chordata
- Class: Reptilia
- Order: Squamata
- Family: Scincidae
- Genus: Ctenotus
- Species: C. astictus

Binomial name
- Ctenotus astictus Horner, 1995

Species of lizard

Ctenotus astictus, known commonly as the Arnhem striped ctenotus, is a species of skink which is endemic to the Northern Territory.
