= Ctenotus agrestis =

Conservation status
- Least Concern (IUCN 3.1)

Scientific classification
- Kingdom: Animalia
- Phylum: Chordata
- Class: Reptilia
- Order: Squamata
- Family: Scincidae
- Genus: Ctenotus
- Species: C. agrestis

Binomial name
- Ctenotus agrestis Wilson & Couper, 1995

Species of lizard

Ctenotus agrestis, also known commonly as the grassplains ctenotus, is a species of skink which is endemic to Queensland.
