= Ctenotus iapetus =

Conservation status
- Least Concern (IUCN 3.1)

Scientific classification
- Kingdom: Animalia
- Phylum: Chordata
- Class: Reptilia
- Order: Squamata
- Family: Scincidae
- Genus: Ctenotus
- Species: C. iapetus

Binomial name
- Ctenotus iapetus Storr, 1975

Species of lizard

Ctenotus iapetus, known commonly as the North West Cape ctenotus, is a species of skink endemic to Western Australia.
