= Ctenotus duricola =

Conservation status
- Least Concern (IUCN 3.1)

Scientific classification
- Kingdom: Animalia
- Phylum: Chordata
- Class: Reptilia
- Order: Squamata
- Family: Scincidae
- Genus: Ctenotus
- Species: C. duricola

Binomial name
- Ctenotus duricola Storr, 1975

Species of lizard

Ctenotus duricola, known commonly as the Eastern Pilbara lined ctenotus or Pilbara ctenotus, is a species of skink endemic to Western Australia.
