= Ctenotus burbidgei =

Conservation status
- Least Concern (IUCN 3.1)

Scientific classification
- Kingdom: Animalia
- Phylum: Chordata
- Class: Reptilia
- Order: Squamata
- Family: Scincidae
- Genus: Ctenotus
- Species: C. burbidgei

Binomial name
- Ctenotus burbidgei Storr, 1975
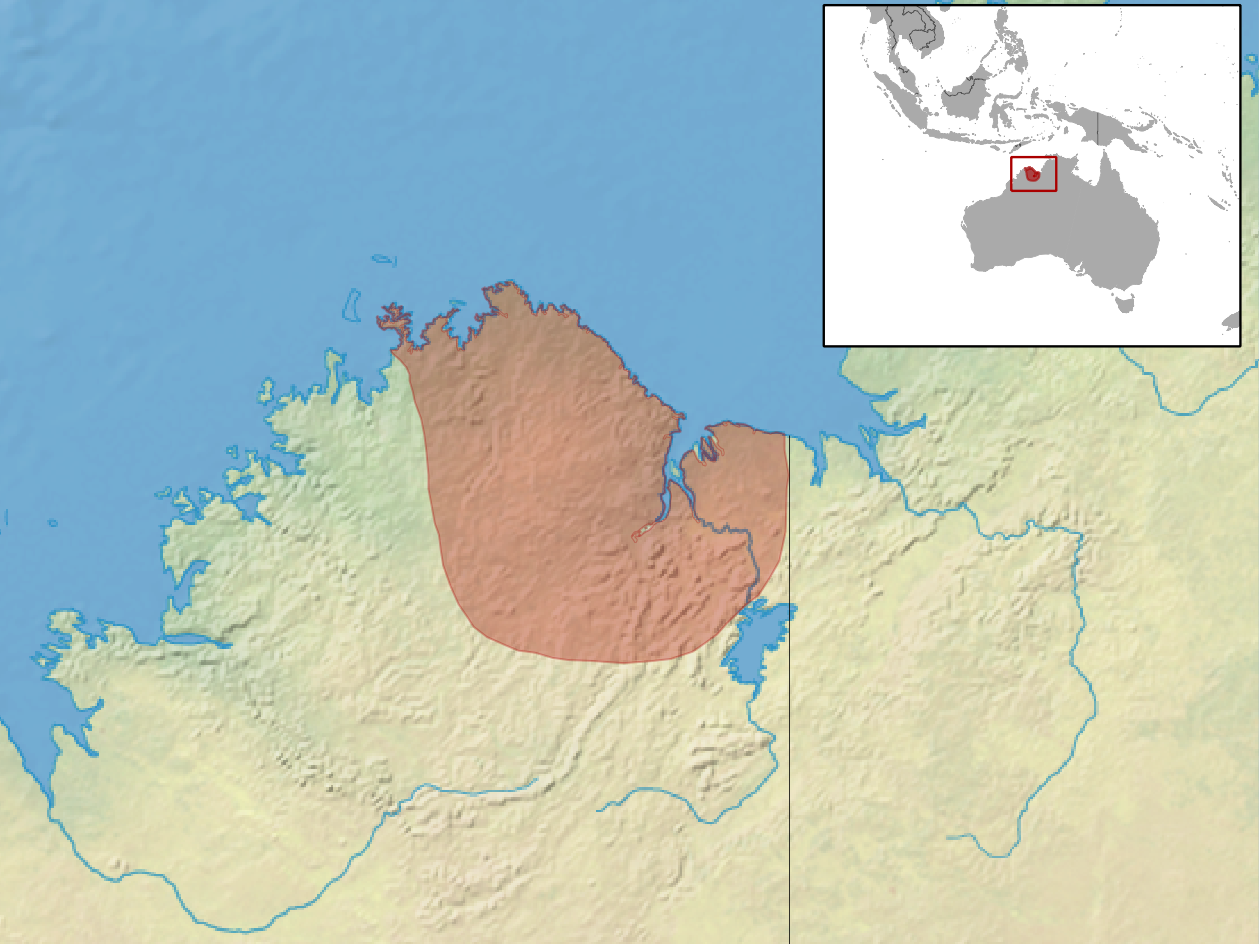

Synonyms
- Ctenotus mastigura burbidgei Storr, 1975; Ctenotus burbidgei — Cogger, 2000

Species of lizard

Ctenotus burbidgei, also known commonly as the plain-backed Kimberley ctenotus, is a species of lizard in the family Scincidae. It is endemic to Western Australia.

== Etymology ==
The specific name, burbidgei, is in honor of Australian zoologist Andrew A. Burbidge.

== Habitat ==
The preferred natural habitats of C. burbidgei are shrubland and savanna.

== Reproduction ==
C. burbidgei is oviparous
