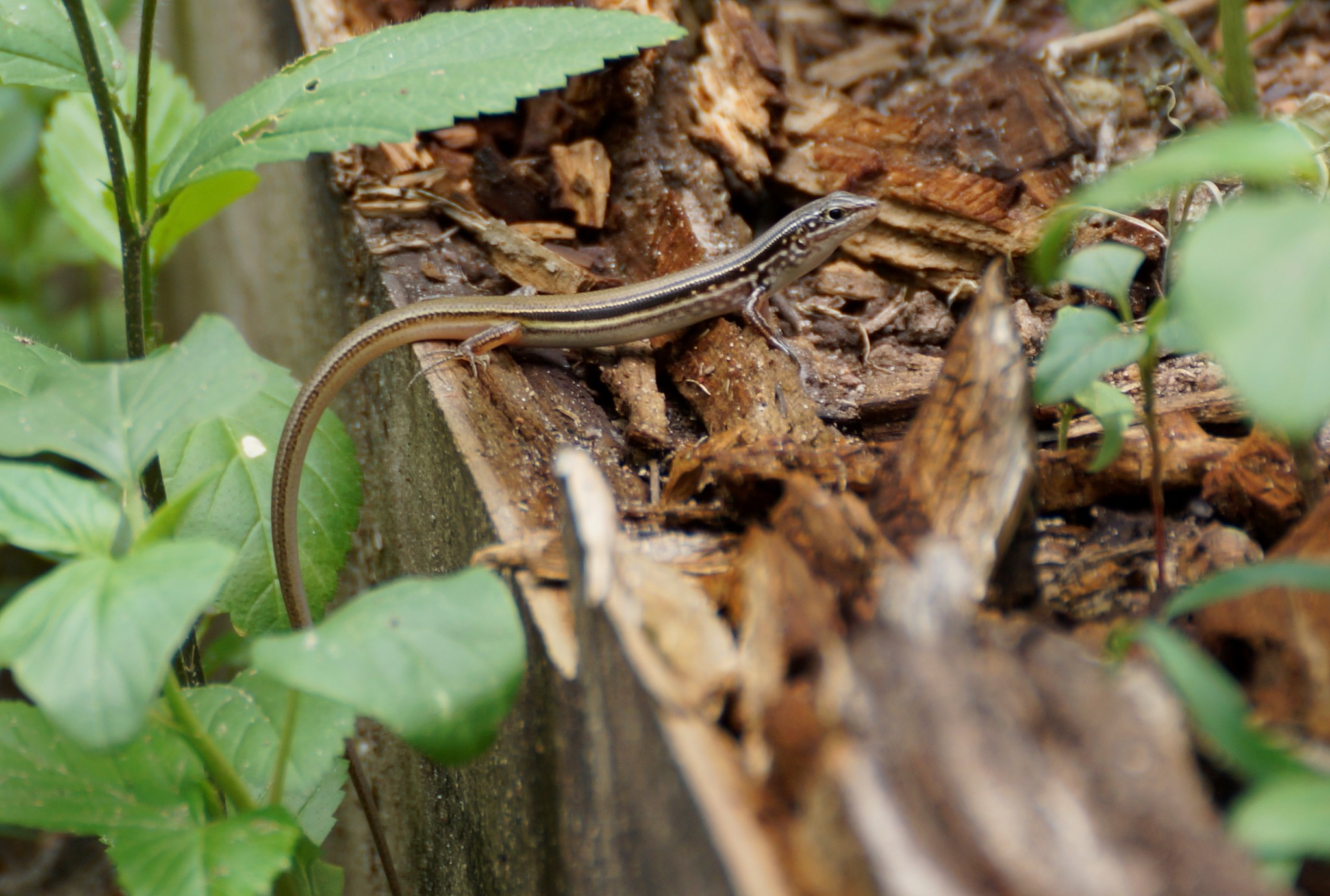

Conservation status
- Least Concern (IUCN 3.1)

Scientific classification
- Kingdom: Animalia
- Phylum: Chordata
- Class: Reptilia
- Order: Squamata
- Family: Scincidae
- Genus: Ctenotus
- Species: C. essingtonii

Binomial name
- Ctenotus essingtonii (Gray, 1842)

Synonyms
- Tiliqua essingtonii Gray, 1842; Lygosoma (Sphenomorphus) essingtonii — Glauert, 1960; Ctenotus essingtoni — Storr, 1981

= Ctenotus essingtonii =

Species of lizard

Ctenotus essingtonii, also known commonly as Essington's ctenotus and the lowlands plain-backed ctenotus, is a species of skink. The species can be found in the Northern Territory and Cape York Peninsula of North Queensland.

== Etymology ==
The specific name, essingtonii, refers to the locality Port Essington, Australia.

== Geographic range ==
C. essingtonii is found in the northern portion of the Northern Territory, including the Tiwi Islands.

== Habitat ==
The preferred natural habitat of C. essingtonii is forest.

== Description ==
C. essingtonii may attain a snout-to-vent length (SVL) of 6.5 cm (2.6 in). It has five toes on each of its four feet. It is slender, with 26 scale rows at midbody.

== Reproduction ==
Sexually mature individuals of C. essingtonii breed during the dry season. The species is oviparous.
