= Ctenotus arnhemensis =

Conservation status
- Least Concern (IUCN 3.1)

Scientific classification
- Kingdom: Animalia
- Phylum: Chordata
- Class: Reptilia
- Order: Squamata
- Family: Scincidae
- Genus: Ctenotus
- Species: C. arnhemensis

Binomial name
- Ctenotus arnhemensis Storr, 1981

Species of lizard

Ctenotus arnhemensis, known commonly as the Jabiluka ctenotus, is a species of skink endemic to the Northern Territory.
