= Ctenotus coggeri =

Conservation status
- Least Concern (IUCN 3.1)

Scientific classification
- Kingdom: Animalia
- Phylum: Chordata
- Class: Reptilia
- Order: Squamata
- Family: Scincidae
- Genus: Ctenotus
- Species: C. coggeri

Binomial name
- Ctenotus coggeri Sadlier, 1985

Species of lizard

The brown-backed ctenotus (Ctenotus coggeri), also known commonly as Cogger's ctenotus, is a species of lizard in the subfamily Sphenomorphinae of the family Scincidae. The species is endemic to the Northern Territory.

== Etymology ==
The specific name, coggeri, is in honor of Australian herpetologist Harold Cogger.

== Habitat ==
The preferred natural habitat of C. coggeri is forest.

== Description ==
C. coggeri is heavy-bodied and large for its genus. The maximum recorded snout-to-vent length (SVL) is 8.0 cm (3.1 in).

== Reproduction ==
C. coggeri is oviparous.
