= Ctenotus joanae =

Conservation status
- Least Concern (IUCN 3.1)

Scientific classification
- Kingdom: Animalia
- Phylum: Chordata
- Class: Reptilia
- Order: Squamata
- Family: Scincidae
- Genus: Ctenotus
- Species: C. joanae

Binomial name
- Ctenotus joanae Storr, 1970

Species of lizard

Ctenotus joanae, also known commonly as the blacksoil ctenotus and the black-soil ctenotus, is a species of lizard in the subfamily Sphenomorphinae of the family Scincidae (skinks). The species is endemic to Australia.

== Etymology ==
The specific name, joanae, is in honor of Australian zoologist Joan Maureen Dixon.

== Geographic range ==
In Australia, C. joanae is found in the Northern Territory and in the states of Queensland and South Australia.

== Habitat ==
The preferred natural habitat of C. joanae is grassland.

== Description ==
C. joanae has five digits on each of its four feet. The prefrontal scales are separated, and the subdigital lamellae are bluntly keeled. Heavy-bodied for its genus, it may attain a snout-to-vent length (SVL) of 8.6 cm (3.4 in).

== Reproduction ==
C. joanae is oviparous.
