= Ctenotus rosarium =

Conservation status
- Least Concern (IUCN 3.1)

Scientific classification
- Kingdom: Animalia
- Phylum: Chordata
- Class: Reptilia
- Order: Squamata
- Suborder: Scinciformata
- Infraorder: Scincomorpha
- Family: Sphenomorphidae
- Genus: Ctenotus
- Species: C. rosarium

Binomial name
- Ctenotus rosarium Couper, Amey, & Kutt, 2002

Species of lizard

Ctenotus rosarium, the beaded ctenotus, is a species of skink found in Queensland in Australia.
