= Ctenotus zebrilla =

Conservation status
- Least Concern (IUCN 3.1)

Scientific classification
- Kingdom: Animalia
- Phylum: Chordata
- Class: Reptilia
- Order: Squamata
- Family: Scincidae
- Genus: Ctenotus
- Species: C. zebrilla

Binomial name
- Ctenotus zebrilla Storr, 1981

Species of lizard

Ctenotus zebrilla, also known commonly as the Southern Cape York fine-snout ctenotus, is a species of skink, a lizard in the family Scincidae. The species is endemic to Australia.

== Etymology ==
The specific name zebrilla is Neo-Latin for "little zebra" in reference to the species' apparent black and white stripes.

== Geographic range and habitat ==
C. zebrilla is found in the north-eastern highlands of Queensland, occupying tall, open woodland on stony hills.

== Description ==
Dorsally, C. zebrilla is black with eight thin, white stripes along its back. It grows to 31–40 mm (1.2–1.6 in) in snout-to-vent length (SVL).

== Reproduction ==
Like many lizards, C. zebrilla is oviparous.
