= Ctenotus capricorni =

Conservation status
- Least Concern (IUCN 3.1)

Scientific classification
- Kingdom: Animalia
- Phylum: Chordata
- Class: Reptilia
- Order: Squamata
- Family: Scincidae
- Genus: Ctenotus
- Species: C. capricorni

Binomial name
- Ctenotus capricorni Storr, 1981

Species of lizard

Ctenotus capricorni, known commonly as the Capricorn ctenotus, is a species of skink endemic to Central Queensland.
