= Ctenotus kurnbudj =

Conservation status
- Endangered (IUCN 3.1)

Scientific classification
- Kingdom: Animalia
- Phylum: Chordata
- Class: Reptilia
- Order: Squamata
- Family: Scincidae
- Genus: Ctenotus
- Species: C. kurnbudj

Binomial name
- Ctenotus kurnbudj Sadlier, Wombey, & Braithwaite, 1986

Species of lizard

Ctenotus kurnbudj, commonly known as the Kurnbudj ctenotus or Alligator Rivers ctenotus, is a species of skink endemic to the Northern Territory.
