= Ctenotus borealis =

Conservation status
- Least Concern (IUCN 3.1)

Scientific classification
- Kingdom: Animalia
- Phylum: Chordata
- Class: Reptilia
- Order: Squamata
- Family: Scincidae
- Genus: Ctenotus
- Species: C. borealis

Binomial name
- Ctenotus borealis Horner & King, 1985

Species of lizard

Ctenotus borealis, known commonly as the white-faced ctenotus, is a species of skink endemic to the Northern Territory.
