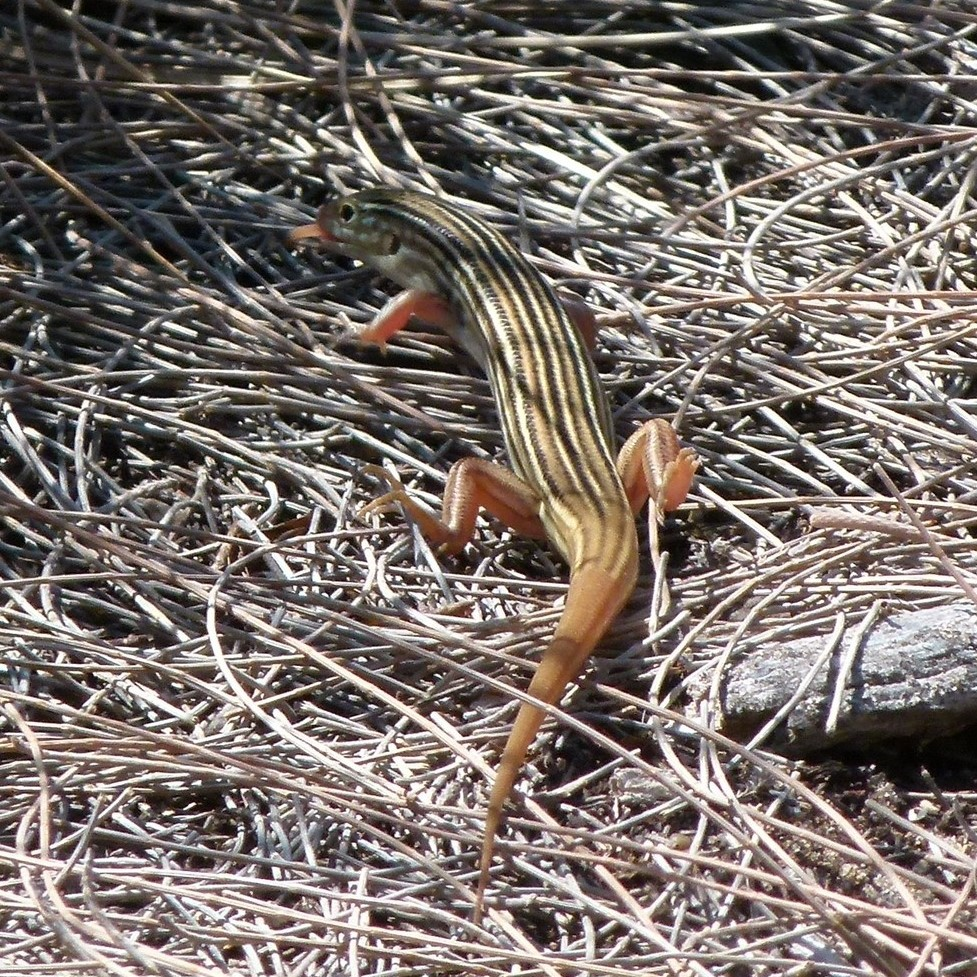

Conservation status
- Least Concern (IUCN 3.1)

Scientific classification
- Kingdom: Animalia
- Phylum: Chordata
- Class: Reptilia
- Order: Squamata
- Family: Scincidae
- Genus: Ctenotus
- Species: C. eutaenius

Binomial name
- Ctenotus eutaenius Storr, 1981

= Ctenotus eutaenius =

Species of lizard

Ctenotus eutaenius, commonly known as the black-backed yellow-lined ctenotus, is a species of skink found in North Queensland.
