= Ctenotus rimacolus =

Conservation status
- Least Concern (IUCN 3.1)

Scientific classification
- Kingdom: Animalia
- Phylum: Chordata
- Class: Reptilia
- Order: Squamata
- Suborder: Scinciformata
- Infraorder: Scincomorpha
- Family: Sphenomorphidae
- Genus: Ctenotus
- Species: C. rimacolus

Binomial name
- Ctenotus rimacolus Horner Fisher, 1998

Species of lizard

Ctenotus rimacolus, the crack-dwelling ctenotus, is a species of skink found in the Northern Territory and Western Australia.
