= Ctenotus saxatilis =

Conservation status
- Least Concern (IUCN 3.1)

Scientific classification
- Kingdom: Animalia
- Phylum: Chordata
- Class: Reptilia
- Order: Squamata
- Family: Scincidae
- Genus: Ctenotus
- Species: C. saxatilis

Binomial name
- Ctenotus saxatilis (Storr, 1970)

Species of lizard

Ctenotus saxatilis, the stony-soil ctenotus, is a species of skink found in Northern Territory, South Australia, and Western Australia.
