= Ctenotus alacer =

Conservation status
- Least Concern (IUCN 3.1)

Scientific classification
- Kingdom: Animalia
- Phylum: Chordata
- Class: Reptilia
- Order: Squamata
- Family: Scincidae
- Genus: Ctenotus
- Species: C. alacer

Binomial name
- Ctenotus alacer Storr, 1970

Species of lizard

Ctenotus alacer, also known as the lively ctenotus, is an Australian species of skink found in the Northern Territory, Queensland, and Western Australia.
