= Ctenotus astarte =

Conservation status
- Least Concern (IUCN 3.1)

Scientific classification
- Kingdom: Animalia
- Phylum: Chordata
- Class: Reptilia
- Order: Squamata
- Family: Scincidae
- Genus: Ctenotus
- Species: C. astarte

Binomial name
- Ctenotus astarte Czechura, 1986

Species of lizard

Ctenotus astarte, also known commonly as the stony downs ctenotus, is a species of skink, a lizard in the family Scincidae. The species is endemic to Australia.

== Etymology ==
The specific name, astarte, is an allusion to Astarte, the goddess of fertility, sexuality, and war in ancient Assyrian mythology.

== Geographic range ==
In Australia, C. astarte is found in southwestern Queensland and extreme northeastern South Australia.

== Habitat ==
The preferred natural habitats of C. astarte are grassland, shrubland, and savanna.

== Description ==
Moderately large for its genus, C. astarte has a snout-to-vent length of 6–8 cm (2.4–3.1 in).

== Reproduction ==
C. astarte is oviparous.
