= Ctenotus nullum =

Conservation status
- Least Concern (IUCN 3.1)

Scientific classification
- Kingdom: Animalia
- Phylum: Chordata
- Class: Reptilia
- Order: Squamata
- Family: Scincidae
- Genus: Ctenotus
- Species: C. nullum

Binomial name
- Ctenotus nullum Ingram & Czechura, 1990

Species of lizard

Ctenotus nullum, commonly known as the nullum ctenotus, is a species of skink found in Queensland, Australia.

== Description ==
The Nullum ctenotus is a moderately large (snout-vent length 45-79 mm) Australian skink found in north Queensland, Australia . The species was described in 1990, with the specific epithet being a patronym derived from the Pakadji (Koko Yao) Aboriginal people of Cape York Peninsula.

The species is restricted in distribution, being found in the vicinity of Laura, Cooktown and Black Mountain.

As with many other Australian Ctenotus species, the Nullum ctenotus has a pattern of stripes, squarish upper lateral blotches and a weak black vertebral stripe.
