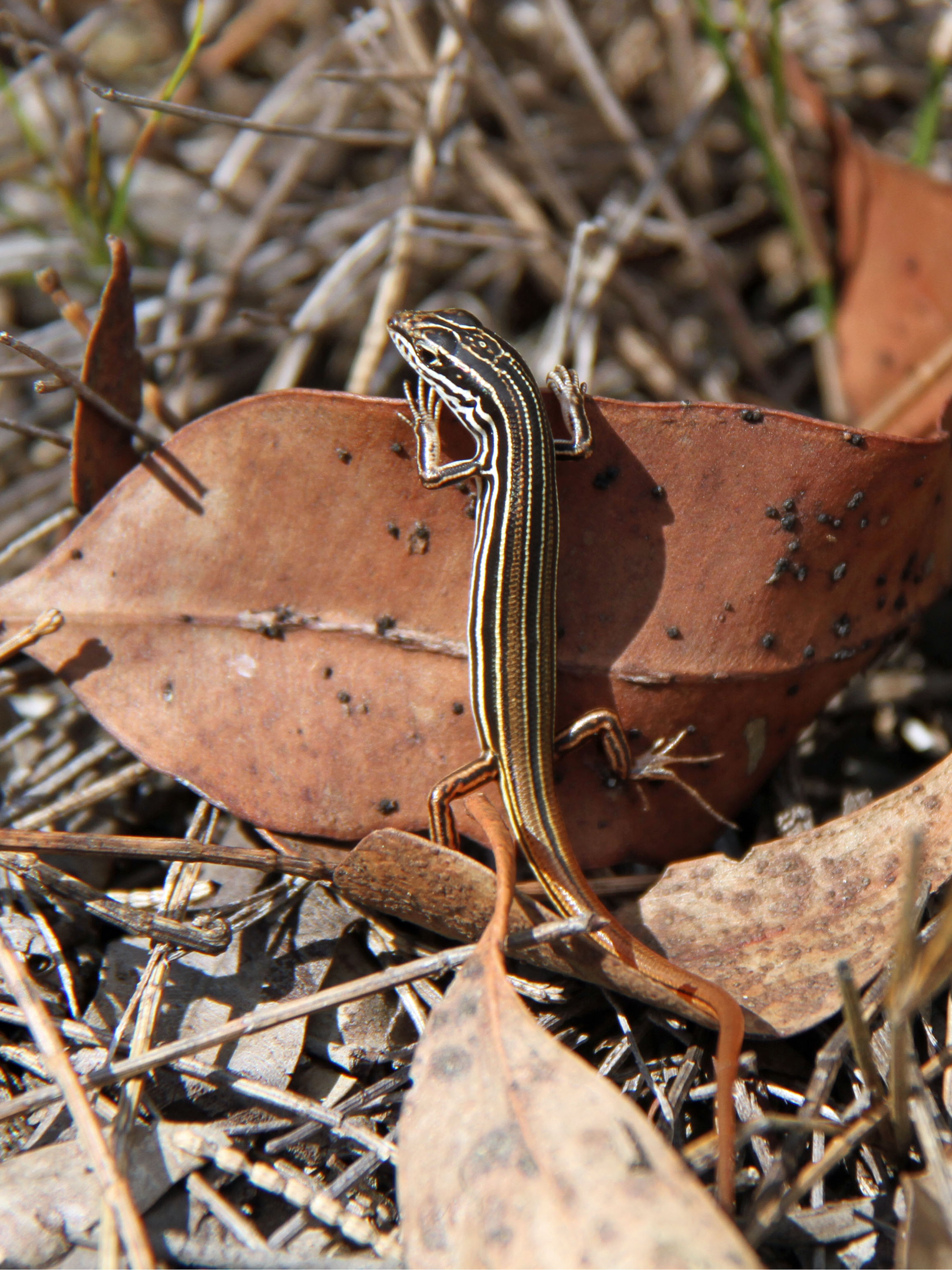

Conservation status
- Least Concern (IUCN 3.1)

Scientific classification
- Kingdom: Animalia
- Phylum: Chordata
- Class: Reptilia
- Order: Squamata
- Suborder: Scinciformata
- Infraorder: Scincomorpha
- Family: Sphenomorphidae
- Genus: Ctenotus
- Species: C. taeniolatus

Binomial name
- Ctenotus taeniolatus (White, 1790)

= Ctenotus taeniolatus =

Species of lizard

Ctenotus taeniolatus, the copper-tailed ctenotus or copper-tailed skink, is a species of medium-sized skink found commonly along the eastern seaboard of Australia and throughout the country generally. Striped skinks are found in open bushland and heathland. They can grow to be 30 cm long.

Striped skinks are olive brown on top with stripes of dark brown and white running from head to tail. They have a black, white-edged vertebral band and a white dorsolateral band edged in black. The sides are dark brown and spotted with white.

Like most skinks, they eat mainly small invertebrates like insects and worms. They live in rocky and sandy areas, seeking sunny basking spots with cover nearby so they can dart away from predators.
