= Ctenotus mastigura =

Conservation status
- Least Concern (IUCN 3.1)

Scientific classification
- Kingdom: Animalia
- Phylum: Chordata
- Class: Reptilia
- Order: Squamata
- Family: Scincidae
- Genus: Ctenotus
- Species: C. mastigura

Binomial name
- Ctenotus mastigura Storr, 1975

Species of lizard

Ctenotus mastigura, known commonly as the whiptail ctenotus, is a species of skink endemic to the Kimberley of Western Australia.
