= Ctenotus impar =

Conservation status
- Least Concern (IUCN 3.1)

Scientific classification
- Kingdom: Animalia
- Phylum: Chordata
- Class: Reptilia
- Order: Squamata
- Family: Scincidae
- Genus: Ctenotus
- Species: C. impar

Binomial name
- Ctenotus impar Storr, 1969

Species of lizard

Ctenotus impar, the odd-striped ctenotus, is a species of skink found in Western Australia. It was first described by Australian biologist Glen Milton Storr in 1969.
