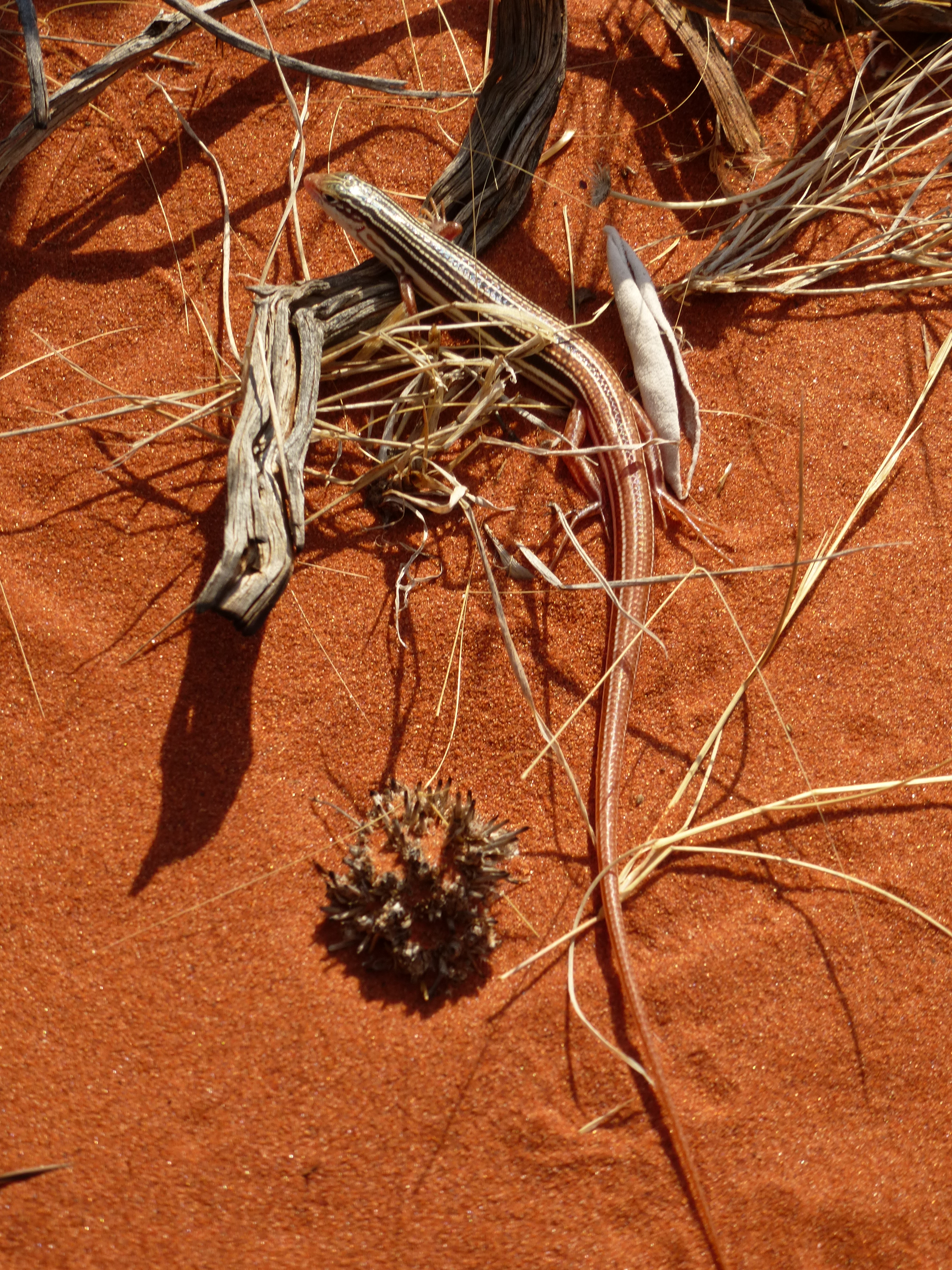

Conservation status
- Least Concern (IUCN 3.1)

Scientific classification
- Kingdom: Animalia
- Phylum: Chordata
- Class: Reptilia
- Order: Squamata
- Family: Scincidae
- Genus: Ctenotus
- Species: C. leae

Binomial name
- Ctenotus leae (Boulenger, 1887)

Synonyms
- Lygosoma leae Boulenger, 1887

= Ctenotus leae =

Species of lizard

Ctenotus leae, also known commonly as the Centralian coppertail, Lea's ctenotus, and the orange-tailed finesnout skink, is a species of lizard in the subfamily Sphenomorphinae of the family Scincidae. The species is endemic to Australia.

== Etymology ==
The specific name, leae, is in honor of the Rev. T.E. Lea who sent the holotype to Boulenger.

== Description ==
C. leae may attain a snout-to-vent length (SVL) of 6 cm (2.4 in).

== Geographic range ==
C. leae is found in the Australian states of Queensland, South Australia, and Western Australia, and the Australian internal territory of the Northern Territory.

== Habitat ==
The preferred natural habitats of C. leae are grassland and desert.

== Behavior ==
C. leae is terrestrial.

== Reproduction ==
C. leae is oviparous. The clutch size is usually three or four eggs.
