= Ctenotus terrareginae =

Conservation status
- Least Concern (IUCN 3.1)

Scientific classification
- Kingdom: Animalia
- Phylum: Chordata
- Class: Reptilia
- Order: Squamata
- Suborder: Scinciformata
- Infraorder: Scincomorpha
- Family: Sphenomorphidae
- Genus: Ctenotus
- Species: C. terrareginae

Binomial name
- Ctenotus terrareginae Ingram & Czechura, 1990

Species of lizard

Ctenotus terrareginae, the Hinchinbrook ctenotus, is a species of skink found in Queensland and Hinchinbrook Island in Australia.
