= Ctenotus atlas =

Conservation status
- Least Concern (IUCN 3.1)

Scientific classification
- Kingdom: Animalia
- Phylum: Chordata
- Class: Reptilia
- Order: Squamata
- Family: Scincidae
- Genus: Ctenotus
- Species: C. atlas

Binomial name
- Ctenotus atlas Storr, 1969

Species of lizard

Ctenotus atlas, the southern mallee ctenotus, is a medium sized lizard in the family scincidae (skink) found in the central and southern interior regions of South Australia and Western Australia; the Mallee regions of NSW and Victoria, in Australia.

== Etymology ==
First recorded and named by G.M Storr of the Museum of Western Australia from a collection of Eric R Pianka in 1968. Also referred to as the Porcupine Grass Ctenotus.

== Distribution ==
As the name suggests the Southern Mallee Ctenotus is found in the mallee regions of south western NSW and Victoria's north west. It can also be found in southern SA and in the central interior of WA. In the mallee regions the key feature of its habitat is the spinifex or porcupine grass (Triodia scariosa). Its distribution includes many other ctenotus skinks which are able to disperse widely over a large area of arid zone with little or no geographic barriers and homogenous climate.

== Description ==
The Southern Mallee Ctenotus is a member of the genus Ctenotus, a large of group of skinks that are small to medium sized (10–30 cm in length) with long and slender tails. They are terrestrial, diurnal, oviparous and their diet consists of invertebrates.

Identifying features of the skink include upper body colour of dark brown or black back and sides with 8 or 10 pale (or white) stripes along the length of body; undersides are white. Other distinguishing features include: 5 digits and 5 toes; conspicuous anterior ear lobules; a moveable lower eyelid; and parietal scales in contact behind the interparietal.

The thermal range of the species is 7 degrees Celsius to 45 degrees Celsius.

== Diet ==
Ctenotus atlas is an insectivore with a varied diet, including bees, wasps, ants; spiders; beetles; termites; cockroaches; crickets and locusts.

== Habitat & Behaviour ==
The Southern Mallee Ctenotus lives in spinifex and porcupine grasses which it uses to shelter and climb. They are more likely to be found within or on such grasses in open areas as opposed to under trees. It is active and forages in and within range of these grasses for insects in the early to mid morning and late afternoon. They are also known to lash their tails while foraging. They breed between October and February and lay an average clutch of 2 eggs.

It is most commonly observed on bare ground followed by dead and then live spinifex (as temperatures increase).

Varanus Gouldii is the main predator of Ctenotus atlas but elapids are also known to predate the species. Tussock and spinifex grasses are effective refugia which protect the species from mammal and bird predation.
