= Ctenotus pulchellus =

Conservation status
- Least Concern (IUCN 3.1)

Scientific classification
- Kingdom: Animalia
- Phylum: Chordata
- Class: Reptilia
- Order: Squamata
- Suborder: Scinciformata
- Infraorder: Scincomorpha
- Family: Sphenomorphidae
- Genus: Ctenotus
- Species: C. pulchellus

Binomial name
- Ctenotus pulchellus Storr, 1978

Species of lizard

Ctenotus pulchellus, the red-sided ctenotus, is a species of skink found in the Northern Territory and Queensland in Australia.
