= Ctenotus grandis =

Conservation status
- Least Concern (IUCN 3.1)

Scientific classification
- Kingdom: Animalia
- Phylum: Chordata
- Class: Reptilia
- Order: Squamata
- Family: Scincidae
- Genus: Ctenotus
- Species: C. grandis

Binomial name
- Ctenotus grandis Storr, 1969

Species of lizard

Ctenotus grandis, the grand ctenotus, is a species of skink found in Northern Territory, Western Australia & South Australia.
