= Ctenotus superciliaris =

Conservation status
- Least Concern (IUCN 3.1)

Scientific classification
- Kingdom: Animalia
- Phylum: Chordata
- Class: Reptilia
- Order: Squamata
- Suborder: Scinciformata
- Infraorder: Scincomorpha
- Family: Sphenomorphidae
- Genus: Ctenotus
- Species: C. superciliaris

Binomial name
- Ctenotus superciliaris Rabosky, Hutchinson, Donnellan, Talaba, & Lovette, 2014

Species of lizard

Ctenotus superciliaris, the sharp-browed ctenotus, is a species of skink found in the Northern Territory in Australia.
