= Ctenotus hilli =

Conservation status
- Least Concern (IUCN 3.1)

Scientific classification
- Kingdom: Animalia
- Phylum: Chordata
- Class: Reptilia
- Order: Squamata
- Family: Scincidae
- Genus: Ctenotus
- Species: C. hilli

Binomial name
- Ctenotus hilli Storr, 1970

Species of lizard

Ctenotus hilli, also known commonly as Hill's ctenotus or the Top-End lowlands ctenotus, is a species of lizard in the subfamily Sphenomorphinae of the family Scincidae. The species is endemic to the Northern Territory.

== Etymology ==
The specific name, hilli, is in honor of Australian zoologist Gerald Freer Hill (1880–1954).

== Habitat ==
The preferred natural habitats of C. hilli are forest and vegetated coastal dunes.

== Description ==
C. hilli has five digits on each of its four feet.

== Reproduction ==
C. hilli is oviparous.
