= Ctenotus halysis =

Conservation status
- Least Concern (IUCN 3.1)

Scientific classification
- Kingdom: Animalia
- Phylum: Chordata
- Class: Reptilia
- Order: Squamata
- Family: Scincidae
- Genus: Ctenotus
- Species: C. halysis

Binomial name
- Ctenotus halysis Horner, 2009

Species of lizard

Ctenotus halysis, the chained ctenotus, is a species of skink found in the Kimberley of Western Australia.
