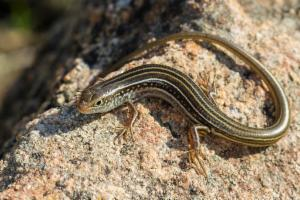

Conservation status
- Least Concern (IUCN 3.1)

Scientific classification
- Kingdom: Animalia
- Phylum: Chordata
- Class: Reptilia
- Order: Squamata
- Family: Scincidae
- Genus: Ctenotus
- Species: C. inornatus

Binomial name
- Ctenotus inornatus (Gray, 1845)
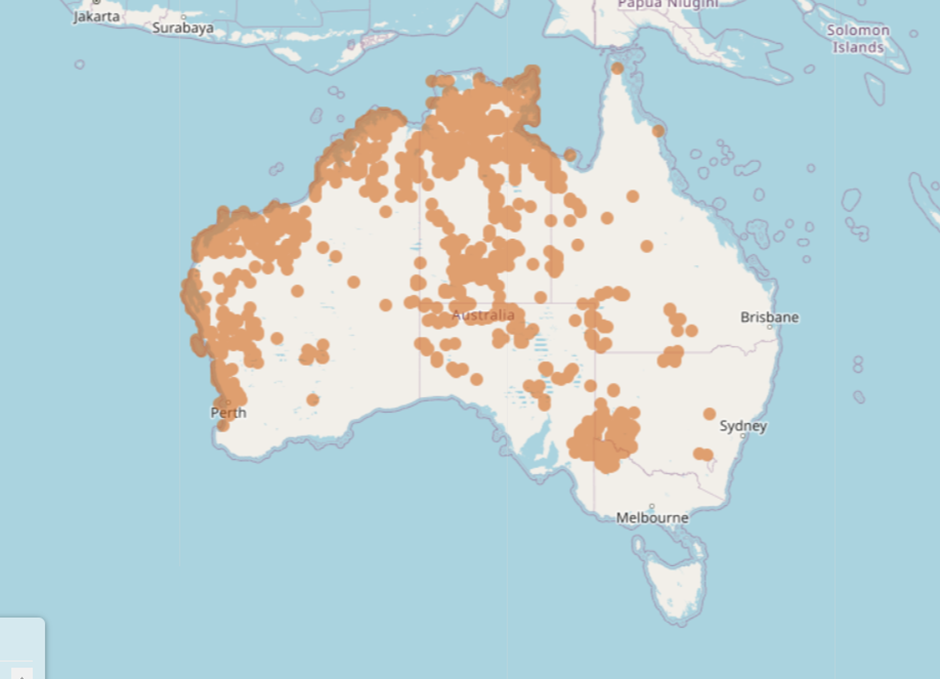

= Ctenotus inornatus =

Species of lizard

Ctenotus inornatus, or commonly known as bar-shouldered ctenotus, is an Australian species of skink found in the Northern Territory, Queensland, and Western Australia.

== Description ==
The Ctenotus inornatus species group (including C. inornatus) typically range from 85 to 110 millimeters in snout-vent length and share a common set of color pattern elements and scalation features. The species group also contains color patterns with a complex mix of spots and stripes.

The Ctenotus inornatus species group features intricate color patterns, which are typically a complex blend of stripes and spots. Their toes are not significantly compressed or only slightly so, their subdigital lamellae possess a relatively broad, flat callus and their nasal are widely separated or in contact.

== Taxonomy ==
Several synonyms exist for this species:

- Ctenotus saxatilis (Storr, 1970)
- Hinulia inornata (Gray 1845)
