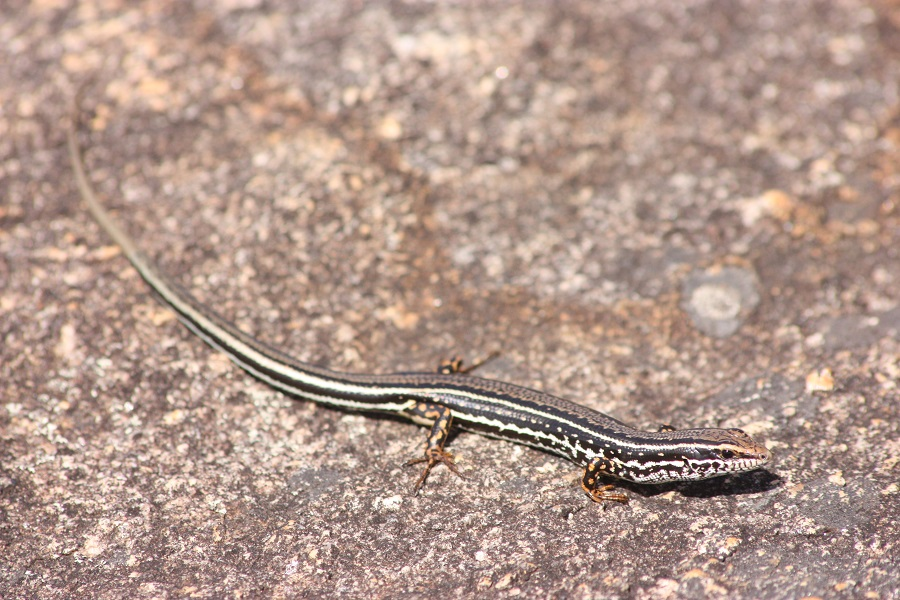

Conservation status
- Least Concern (IUCN 3.1)

Scientific classification
- Kingdom: Animalia
- Phylum: Chordata
- Class: Reptilia
- Order: Squamata
- Family: Scincidae
- Genus: Ctenotus
- Species: C. labillardieri

Binomial name
- Ctenotus labillardieri (A.M.C. Duméril & Bibron, 1839)

Synonyms
- Gongylus labillardieri A.M.C. Duméril & Bibron, 1839; Lygosoma labillardieri (A.M.C. Duméril & Bibron, 1839); Sphenomorphus labillardieri (A.M.C. Duméril & Bibron, 1839); Hinulia greyii Gray, 1845

= Ctenotus labillardieri =

Species of lizard

Ctenotus labillardieri, also known commonly as the common south-west ctenotus, Labillardier's ctenotus, and the red-legged ctenotus, is a species of skink, a lizard in the family Scincidae. The species is endemic to the Australian state of Western Australia.

== Etymology ==
The specific name, labillardieri, is in honor of French botanist Jacques Labillardière.

== Description ==
C. labillardieri has reddish brown legs, which are boldly marbled with black. The pale dorsolateral stripe is uninterrupted. The ventral surfaces are yellow. It may attain a snout-to-vent length (SVL) of 7.5 cm (3.0 in).

== Geographic range ==
C. labillardieri is found in southwestern Western Australia, including some offshore islands.

== Habitat ==
The preferred natural habitats of C. labillardieri are forest, shrubland, and freshwater wetlands, at altitudes from sea level to 1,095 m (3,593 ft).

== Reproduction ==
C. labillardieri is oviparous.
