= Ctenotus kutjupa =

Scientific classification
- Kingdom: Animalia
- Phylum: Chordata
- Class: Reptilia
- Order: Squamata
- Family: Scincidae
- Genus: Ctenotus
- Species: C. kutjupa

Binomial name
- Ctenotus kutjupa Hutchinson, Prates, & Rabosky, 2022

Species of lizard

Ctenotus kutjupa is a species of skink found in Western Australia, the Northern Territory, and South Australia.
