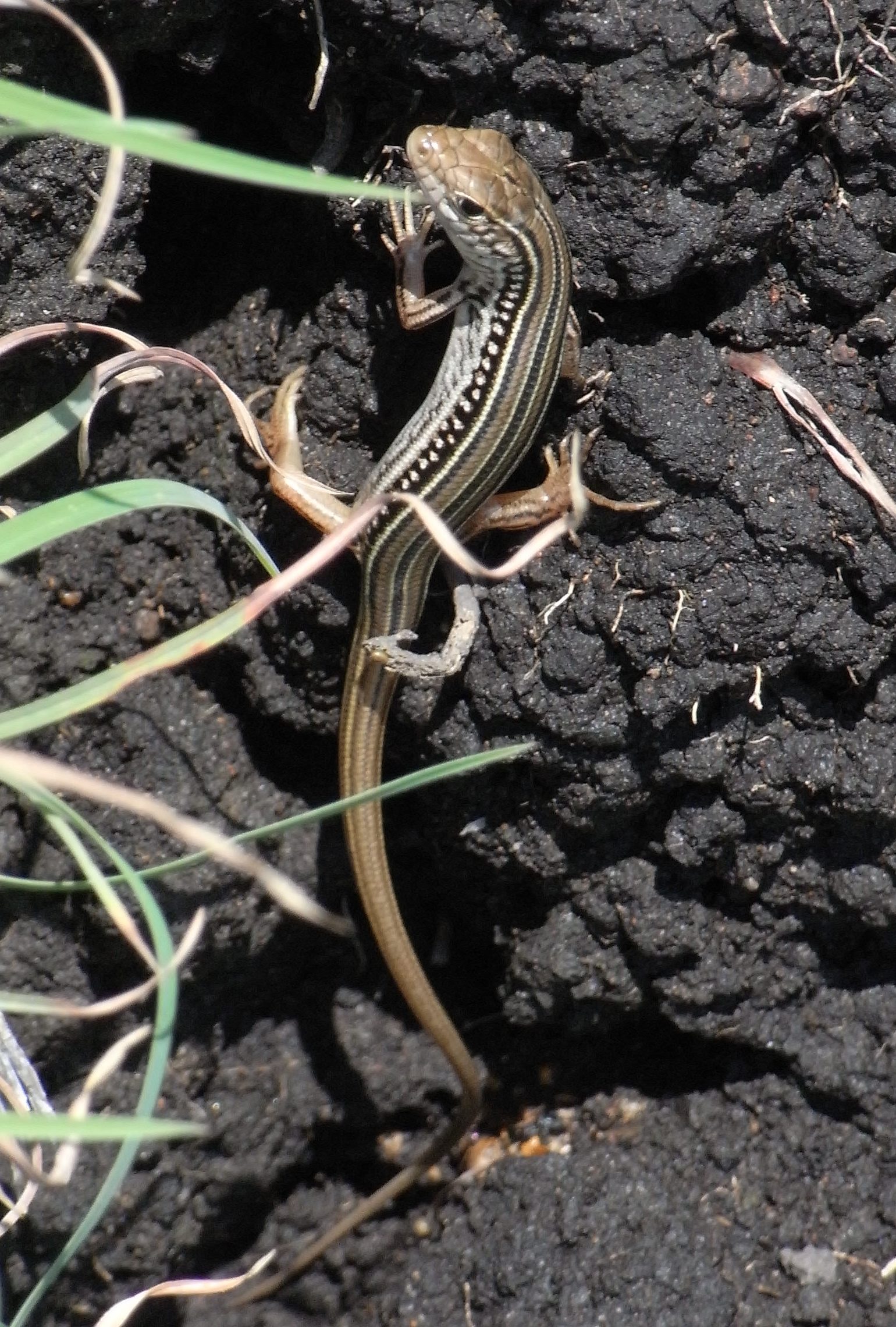
- Ctenotus robustus, robust striped skink

Scientific classification
- Kingdom: Animalia
- Phylum: Chordata
- Class: Reptilia
- Order: Squamata
- Family: Scincidae
- Subfamily: Sphenomorphinae
- Genus: Ctenotus; Storr, 1964

Species
- About 100, see list.

= Ctenotus =

Genus of lizards

Ctenotus is a genus of skinks, lizards in the family Scincidae. The genus is endemic to Australia. The genus Ctenotus belongs to a clade in the Sphenomorphus group which contains such genera as Anomalopus and the close relatives Eulamprus and Gnypetoscincus.

Lizards in the genus Ctenotus are commonly called comb-eared skinks, a reference to the scales aligned near the ear. Ctenotus lizards are able to move very quickly, disappearing whilst being observed. They are highly active in their habits, foraging amongst a diverse range of habitat.

The members of the genus Ctenotus are widely distributed, in all states of Australia, and are especially diverse in arid regions and the tropical north, accounting for 10–20% of the lizard species. Around a quarter of lizards found in one area of the Great Sandy Desert are Ctenotus skinks, 11 of the 40 species. A single dune may have up to six species of Ctenotus. The Southwest Australian region contains 23 species. The size ranges from very small to moderately large, being similarly varied in body types from slender to stout. The diversity of forms allows species to occupy different niches, often in the same locality.

== Species ==
Ctenotus is the most diverse reptile genus in Australia, with approximately 100 member species. Identification to the rank of species is regarded as difficult, and the largest lizard genus is also one of the most poorly understood.

- Ctenotus agrestis S. Wilson & Couper, 1995 – Mitchell grass ctenotus
- Ctenotus alacer Storr, 1970 – lively ctenotus
- Ctenotus alleni Storr, 1974 – Ajana ctenotus
- Ctenotus allotropis Storr, 1981 – brown-blazed wedgesnout ctenotus
- Ctenotus angusticeps Storr, 1988 – northwestern coastal ctenotus, little leopard ctenotus, Airlie Island ctenuous
- Ctenotus aphrodite Ingram & Czechura, 1990 – Oorida ctenotus
- Ctenotus arcanus Czechura & Wombey, 1982 – arcane ctenotus
- Ctenotus ariadnae Storr, 1969 – Ariadna's ctenotus
- Ctenotus arnhemensis Storr, 1981 – Jabiluka ctenotus
- Ctenotus astarte Czechura, 1986 – stony downs ctenotus
- Ctenotus astictus Horner, 1995 – Arnhem striped ctenotus
- Ctenotus atlas Storr, 1969 – southern mallee ctenotus
- Ctenotus australis (Gray, 1838) – western limestone ctenotus
- Ctenotus borealis Horner & King, 1985 – white-faced ctenotus
- Ctenotus brachyonyx Storr, 1971 – short-clawed ctenotus
- Ctenotus brevipes Storr, 1981 – short-footed ctenotus
- Ctenotus brooksi (Loveridge, 1933) – wedgesnout ctenotus
- Ctenotus burbidgei Storr, 1975 – plain-backed Kimberley ctenotus
- Ctenotus calurus Storr, 1969 – blue-tailed finesnout ctenotus
- Ctenotus capricorni Storr, 1981 – Capricorn ctenotus
- Ctenotus catenifer Storr, 1974 – chain-striped south-west ctenotus
- Ctenotus coggeri Sadlier, 1985 – brown-backed ctenotus
- Ctenotus colletti (Boulenger, 1896) – Collett’s skink, buff-tailed finesnout ctenotus
- Ctenotus decaneurus Storr, 1970 – ten-lined ctenotus
- Ctenotus delli Storr, 1974 – Darling Range south-west ctenotus
- Ctenotus duricola Storr, 1975 – Eastern Pilbara lined ctenotus, Pilbara ctenotus
- Ctenotus dux Storr, 1969 – fine side-lined ctenotus
- Ctenotus ehmanni Storr, 1985 – brown-tailed finesnout ctenotus
- Ctenotus essingtonii (Gray, 1842) – lowlands plain-backed ctenotus
- Ctenotus euclae Storr, 1971 – wedgesnout ctenotus
- Ctenotus eurydice Czechura & Wombey, 1982 – brown-backed yellow-lined ctenotus
- Ctenotus eutaenius Storr, 1981 – black-backed yellow-lined ctenotus
- Ctenotus fallens Storr, 1974 – West-coast laterite ctenotus
- Ctenotus gagudju Sadlier, Wombey & Braithwaite, 1986 – Magela ctenotus, Kakadu ctenotus
- Ctenotus gemmula Storr, 1974 – jewelled south-west ctenotus
- Ctenotus grandis Storr, 1969 – grand ctenotus
- Ctenotus greeri Storr, 1979 – spotted-necked ctenotus
- Ctenotus halysis Horner, 2009 – chained ctenotus
- Ctenotus hanloni Storr, 1980 – nimble ctenotus
- Ctenotus hebetior Storr, 1978 – stout ctenotus
- Ctenotus helenae Storr, 1969 – clay-soil ctenotus
- Ctenotus hilli Storr, 1970 – top-end lowlands ctenotus
- Ctenotus iapetus Storr, 1975 – North West Cape ctenotus
- Ctenotus impar Storr, 1969 – odd-striped ctenotus
- Ctenotus ingrami Czechura & Wombey, 1982 – unspotted yellow-sided ctenotus
- Ctenotus inornatus (Gray, 1845) – bar-shouldered ctenotus
- Ctenotus joanae Storr, 1970 – black-soil ctenotus
- Ctenotus kurnbudj Sadlier, Wombey & Braithwaite, 1986 – Kurnbudj ctenotus
- Ctenotus kutjupa Hutchinson, Prates & Rabosky, 2022
- Ctenotus labillardieri (A.M.C. Duméril & Bibron, 1839) – common south-west ctenotus
- Ctenotus lancelini Ford, 1969 – Lancelin Island skink, Lancelin south-west ctenotus
- Ctenotus lateralis Storr, 1978 – gravelly-soil ctenotus
- Ctenotus leae (Boulenger, 1887) – orange-tailed finesnout skink
- Ctenotus leonhardii (Sternfeld, 1919) – Leonhardi's ctenotus, Leonhardi's skink, common desert ctenotus
- Ctenotus maryani Aplin & Adams, 1998 – Maryan's ctenotus
- Ctenotus mastigura Storr, 1975 – whiptail ctenotus
- Ctenotus mesotes Horner, 2009 – median-striped ctenotus
- Ctenotus militaris Storr, 1975 – soldier ctenotus
- Ctenotus mimetes Storr, 1969 – checker-sided ctenotus
- Ctenotus monticola Storr, 1981 – Atherton ctenotus
- Ctenotus nasutus Storr, 1969 – nasute finesnout ctenotus
- Ctenotus nigrilineatus Storr, 1990 – pin-striped finesnout ctenotus
- Ctenotus nullum Ingram & Czechura, 1990 – nullum ctenotus
- Ctenotus olympicus Hutchinson & Donnellan, 1999 – spotted ctenotus
- Ctenotus ora Kay & Keogh, 2012 – coastal plains skink
- Ctenotus orientalis Storr, 1971 – oriental ctenotus
- Ctenotus pallasotus Rabosky & Doughty, 2017 – Western Pilbara lined ctenotus
- Ctenotus pallescens Storr, 1970 – north-western wedgesnout ctenotus
- Ctenotus pantherinus (W. Peters, 1866) - leopard ctenotus
- Ctenotus piankai Storr, 1969 - course sand ctenotus
- Ctenotus pulchellus Storr, 1978 - red-sided ctenotus
- Ctenotus quattuordecimlineatus (Sternfeld, 1919) - fourteen-lined ctenotus
- Ctenotus quinkan Ingram, 1979 - Quinkan ctenotus
- Ctenotus quirinus Horner, 2007 - Arnhem land ctenotus
- Ctenotus rawlinsoni Ingram, 1979 - Cape Heath ctenotus
- Ctenotus regius Storr, 1971 - pale-rumped ctenotus
- Ctenotus rhabdotus Rabosky & Doughty, 2017 - Kimberley lined ctenotus
- Ctenotus rimacolus Horner & Fisher, 1998 - crack-dwelling ctenotus
- Ctenotus robustus Storr, 1970 - robust ctenotus, striped skink
- Ctenotus rosarium Couper, Amey & Kutt, 2002 - beaded ctenotus
- Ctenotus rubicundus Storr, 1978 - ruddy ctenotus
- Ctenotus rufescens Storr, 1979 - rufous finesnout ctenotus
- Ctenotus rutilans Storr, 1980 - rusty-shouldered ctenotus
- Ctenotus saxatilis Storr, 1970 - stony-soil ctenotus
- Ctenotus schevilli (Loveridge, 1933) - black-soil rises ctenotus
- Ctenotus schomburgkii (W. Peters, 1863) - barred wedge-snout ctenotus
- Ctenotus septenarius King, Horner & Fyfe, 1988 - massive-gibber ctenotus
- Ctenotus serotinus Czechura, 1986 - gravel-downs ctenotus
- Ctenotus serventyi Storr, 1975 - north-western sandy-loam ctenotus
- Ctenotus severus Storr, 1969 - stern ctenotus
- Ctenotus spaldingi (Macleay, 1877) - straight-browed ctenotus
- Ctenotus storri Rankin, 1978 - buff-striped ctenotus
- Ctenotus strauchii (Boulenger, 1887) - eastern barred wedge-snout ctenotus
- Ctenotus striaticeps Storr, 1978 - stripe-headed finesnout ctenotus
- Ctenotus stuarti Horner, 1995 - Stuart's ctenotus
- Ctenotus superciliaris Rabosky, Hutchinson, Donnellan, Talaba & Lovette, 2014 - sharp-browed ctenotus
- Ctenotus taeniatus (Mitchell, 1949) - eyrean ctenotus
- Ctenotus taeniolatus (White, 1790) – copper-tailed skink, copper-tailed ctenotus
- Ctenotus tanamiensis Storr, 1970 – Tanami ctenotus
- Ctenotus tantillus Storr, 1975 – Kimberley wedge-snout ctenotus
- Ctenotus terrareginae Ingram & Czechura, 1990 – Hinchinbrook ctenotus
- Ctenotus uber Storr, 1969 – spotted ctenotus
- Ctenotus vagus Horner, 2009 – uneven-striped ctenotus
- Ctenotus vertebralis Rankin & Gillam, 1979 – scant-striped ctenotus
- Ctenotus xenopleura Storr, 1981 – wide-striped ctenotus
- Ctenotus youngsoni Storr, 1975 – Shark Bay south-west ctenotus
- Ctenotus zastictus Storr, 1984 – Hamelin ctenotus, Hamelin Pool ctenotus
- Ctenotus zebrilla Storr, 1981 – Southern Cape York fine-snout ctenotus

Nota bene: A binomial authority in parentheses indicates that the species was originally described in a genus other than Ctenotus.
