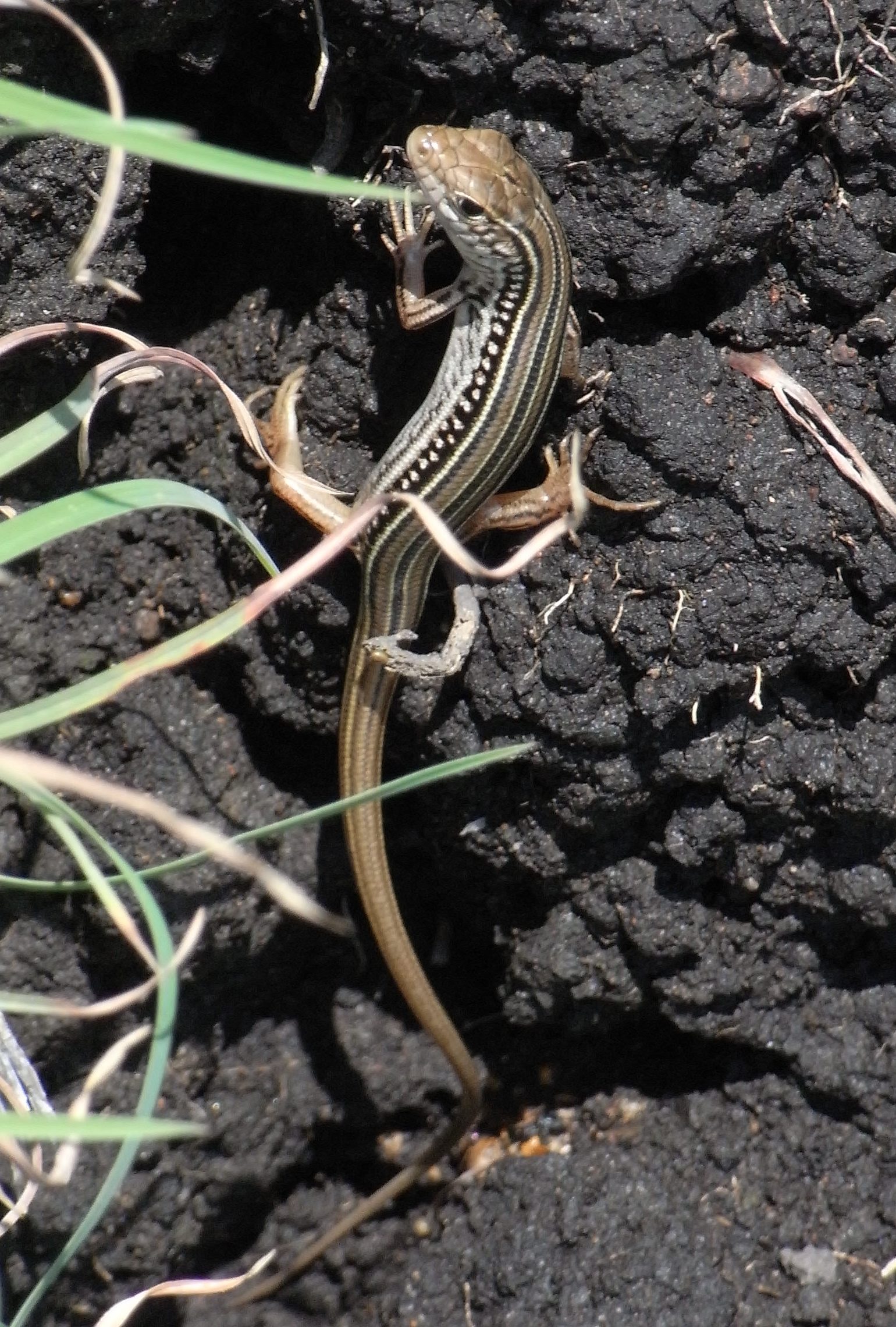
- Hat Head National Park, Australia

Conservation status
- Least Concern (IUCN 3.1)

Scientific classification
- Kingdom: Animalia
- Phylum: Chordata
- Class: Reptilia
- Order: Squamata
- Family: Scincidae
- Genus: Ctenotus
- Species: C. robustus

Binomial name
- Ctenotus robustus Storr, 1970

= Ctenotus robustus =

Species of lizard

Ctenotus robustus, the eastern striped skink, is a species of skink found in a wide variety of habitats around Australia. They are long-tailed, fast moving skinks that are quite large, growing to a maximum length of about 30 cm (including the tail which can make up around 2/3 of its length). This skink is mostly brown with a white-edged black stripe running down the length of its back and tail with broad brown stripes along the side of the body with rows of white spots. The sides become lighter, turning into an off-white colour towards the underside of the skink, running from the groin to the chin. The striped skink (Ctenotus robustus) is similar in appearance to the spotted-back skink (Ctenotus uber orientalis) with the main identifying difference being the solid stripe running down the back of C. robustus whereas C. uber orientalis has a row of dots.

The eastern striped skink is a wary diurnal skink that typically inhabits mostly open areas with the option of shelter in grass, low shrubs or rocks, and will burrow under rocks or logs when seeking shelter.

== Ecology ==
C. robustus are diurnal creatures and surface active, using rocks, logs and ground litter for shelter and create burrows under rocks for the purpose of hibernation and nesting. All Ctenotus skinks are egg layers, and the female C. robustus will lay 4 to 8 eggs, with larger skinks typically laying more eggs. Eggs are laid in late spring (October–December) and hatch about 2 months later. They feed mostly on arthropods and occasionally other young lizards, and are preyed upon by snakes and feral cats. They are very shy and very quick, so disappear into shelter when humans or other larger creatures are close by, this makes them difficult to spot.

== Distribution ==
The eastern striped skink has an extensive distribution, stretching from northern parts of Western Australia and the Northern Territory, through eastern Queensland, New South Wales and Victoria and into the eastern reaches of South Australia. They prefer to inhabit relatively undisturbed areas or areas of low grazing pressure, where there has been less anthropogenic disturbance and activity. They tend to occupy the warmer areas of forests, woodlands, shrublands and heathlands as well as warm grassy hillsides in temperate regions.

== Conservation status ==
C. robustus is listed as Least Concern across all States of Australia.

== Life history traits ==
The genus Ctenotus represents one of Australia's richest and most diverse vertebrate clades, with over 100 species of scincid lizards. The species C. robustus now includes skinks previously known as Ctenotus borealis.

C. robustus males have been found to reach sexual maturity at a smaller snout-vent length than females (males: 72mm vs. females: 78mm) in a study conducted by Taylor J.E. (2004). In this same study, C robustus males, like most (but not all) Ctenotus species, were most reproductive from August to December (the dry season), with maximum testis volume occurring in early spring and minimum testis volume observed in early autumn. Similarly, females were found to contain yolking follicles or eggs from October to January, producing clutch sizes of 4–9. The eggs were laid in nests 4–5 cm deep in open sandy areas with sparse vegetation. C. robustus hatchlings emerged around mid-January to early August and averaged 35.9mm snout-vent length.

There are 53 recognised species of Ctenotus but with several species yet to be described the number of species in the genus probably exceeds 60. The genus is widespread throughout Australia except for Tasmania, with a few species even extending north to southern New Guinea. Most Ctenotus have a slightly conical snout, brought about by the narrowing of the premaxillary region resulting in a reduced number of premaxillary teeth, similar to other species of skink.

Skinks in general have unspecialised social behaviour and the displays which do occur typically become stereotyped for the whole family. Whilst some species are known to be territorial or aggressive, C. robustus does not display these behaviours either in the field or in the laboratory. When several C. robustus skinks were placed in a cage together, they tended to form a group and stayed near each other. Their lack of aggression and hierarchical structure sets C. robustus apart from other members of Sphenomorphus (common skink) species. Its behavioural differences as well as some morphological differences prompted the taxonomic removal of C. robustus from the genus Sphenomorphus and into the genus Ctenotus.
