= Lerista xanthura =

Conservation status
- Least Concern (IUCN 3.1)

Scientific classification
- Kingdom: Animalia
- Phylum: Chordata
- Order: Squamata
- Family: Scincidae
- Genus: Lerista
- Species: L. xanthura

Binomial name
- Lerista xanthura Storr, 1976

Species of lizard

The yellow-tailed plain slider (Lerista xanthura) is a species of skink located primarily in the desert areas of South Australia, Western Australia, Northern Territory and New South Wales in Australia. This uncommon lizard can be identified by its bright yellow tail, and is usually found buried under loose soil, tree stumps and leaf litter.

== Description ==
The Yellow-tailed Plain Slider is a small skink approximately 90mm in length, with a snout to vent length of 40-45mm. Its scales are a pale pink colour with brown edges on the body's upper surface, and a whitish lower surface. Its most distinguishable feature is the long bright yellow tail. It has 4 digits on each limb, with its forelimbs reaching 6mm in length and hindlimbs 12mm. A single pair of preanal scales are present before its vent, and it has a distinct ear opening.

It has many features that differentiate it from other Lerista species, these include the two preocular scales, the nasal areas are in close contact that they appear to be touching, the lower eyelid is fixed and unmovable, it has 18 mid body scale rows and does not have an upper lateral stripe.

== Taxonomy ==
The Yellow-tailed Plain Slider is a member of the Lerista genus of Skinks found only in Australia, of which there are approximately 90 species. A monophyletic group; Orientalis was proposed in 1990 which includes the Desert Plain Slider, Lerista aericeps, McIvor River Slider Lerista ingrami, Wood-mulch Slider Lerista muelleri, North-Eastern Orange-tailed Slider Lerista orientalis, Ribbon Slider Lerista taeniata, Yellow-tailed Plain Slider Lerista xanthura and the White-striped Four-toed Slider Lerista zonulata.

The closely related Desert Plain Slider (Lerista aericeps) was considered to be the same species, but the Yellow-tailed Plain Slider's paler colouration and longer limbs has kept the species separate. The singular preocular scale of the Desert Plain Slider versus the two of the Yellow-tailed Plain Slider is considered to be differentiating features of these species.

== Distribution and habitat ==
The current distribution of the species has been disputed, due to low numbers of sightings since discovery and the overlapping of similar species. The Yellow-tailed Plain Slider has been recorded in the deserts of New South Wales, South Australia, Western Australia and the Northern Territory. In NSW it is believed to have a disjoined distribution, being found in the Lower Murray Darling region, all the way up through the Kinchega, Mutawintji and Sturt National Parks. Records also show it occurs as far East as the Paroo River. In Western Australia it has been recorded throughout the Gibson and Little Sandy Desert.

Due to its apparent wide distribution across the Australian mainland, it can be seen habituating a variety of environments, these include; dry open woodlands, grassed alluvial sand dunes and spinifex dominated sand plains. It is considered a mallee specialist

== Ecology ==
=== Feeding ===
The Yellow-tailed Plain Slider is insectivorous, feeding on ants, termites and other small insects found in loose soil, under stones, fallen trees and in termite mounds. It is a nocturnal, burrowing species that emerges at night to feed.

=== Breeding ===
Not much is known on the breeding of the Yellow-tailed Plain Slider, however, like all members of the Lerista genus it is oviparous and lays eggs.

== Status and conservation ==
In New South Wales it is classified as vulnerable due to the effects of various factors throughout its habitat, as well as this the lack of knowledge of the species. This along with a lack of accurate data on current numbers make it difficult to accurately assess its conservation status. The biggest factor that threatens the species is habitat loss, this can be from land clearing for grazing purposes, as well as damage from bushfires or controlled burns. Drought also has an impact on the quality of the environment it resides in, causing the death of vegetation used for protection and food, as well as decreasing available water.

Invasive species such as cats and foxes are another threat to this species. Current conservation plans aim to reduce the number of pets in the Sliders habitat, as well as prevention of future land clearing and retaining of low lying shrubs and leaf litter. Preferred vegetation such as Triodia should also be maintained at sustainable numbers where possible.

Increasing temperatures and unpredictable flooding events have also shown to threaten the populations of the Slider near the Darling River.
