= Lerista frosti =

Conservation status
- Least Concern (IUCN 3.1)

Scientific classification
- Kingdom: Animalia
- Phylum: Chordata
- Class: Reptilia
- Order: Squamata
- Family: Scincidae
- Genus: Lerista
- Species: L. frosti

Binomial name
- Lerista frosti (Zietz, 1920)

Synonyms
- Rhodona tetradactyla Lucas & Frost, 1895; Lygosoma frosti Zietz, 1920; Rhodona frosti — M.A. Smith, 1937; Lygosoma (Rhodona) frosti — Glauert, 1960; Lerista frosti — Storr, 1976; Tychismia frosti — Wells, 2012

Species of lizard

Lerista frosti, also known commonly as the Centralian slider and Frost's lerista, is a small species of lizard in the family Scincidae. The species is native to Central Australia.

== Taxonomy ==
A description of the species was presented to the Royal Society of Victoria in 1895 by Arthur H. S. Lucas and Charles Frost, proposing the name Rhodona tetradactyla. The taxon was reassigned to the genus Lygosoma by Frederick Robert Zietz, and as the earlier binomial was preoccupied (as a synonym for Mocoa tetradactyla), he named the species after Frost.

The taxonomic description is historically uncertain, having been associated with a poorly resolved species group, and was revised to separate new species in 1985, newly named as Lerista flammicauda and Lerista chalybura in the northwest of Australia and Lerista dorsalis found in a southern distribution range.

== Description ==
L. frosti is a species of Lerista which is distinguished by a small and slight form, eyelids that are movable, and a less distinct dark stripe at the midline of each side. The overall coloration is olive grey to brown at the upperside (dorsally), perhaps displaying greenish or red-brown tones, and with two or four rows of dark dot markings extending along the back. The dark pattern begins near the ear and ends along the tail, sometimes displaying light dot or dash marks. The limbs are functional, although the forelimbs are short at less than 6 mm (0.24 in), and each foot bears four digits. The tail is reddish brown, and the dark mid-line pattern from the ear becomes less well defined. The measured range of the snout-to-vent length (SVL) is 36–60 mm (1.4–2.4 in), giving an average of 47 mm (1.9 in). The coloration of this species has a close resemblance to another species of the genus, L. orientalis.

== Geographic range ==
L. frosti is found in and around the McDonnell Ranges in central and southern Northern Territory, Australia.

== Habitat ==
The preferred natural habitat of L. frosti is usually sandy plains adjacent to refuge under rocks or vegetation.
