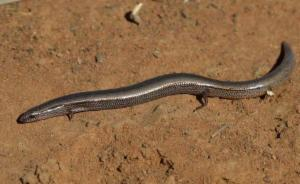

Conservation status
- Least Concern (IUCN 3.1)

Scientific classification
- Kingdom: Animalia
- Phylum: Chordata
- Class: Reptilia
- Order: Squamata
- Suborder: Scinciformata
- Infraorder: Scincomorpha
- Family: Sphenomorphidae
- Genus: Lerista
- Species: L. timida

Binomial name
- Lerista timida (De Vis, 1888)
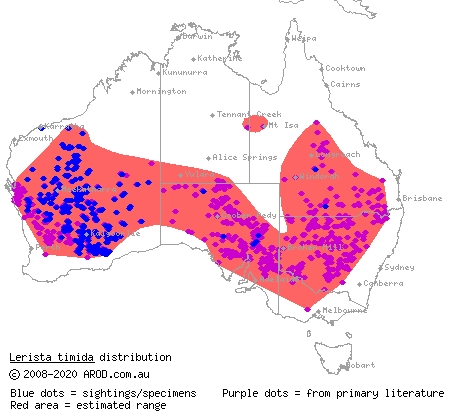
- Lerista timida distribution

= Lerista timida =

Australian species of skink

Lerista timida, the dwarf three-toed slider or wood mulch-slider, is a species of skink found in Australia. Other common names for the species include timid slider and dwarf burrowing skink. The skink is a member of the Lerista genus which are confined to continental Australia and are mostly a burrowing species of skink. The genus consists of consists elongated, smooth-scaled, Fossorial lizards that are specialized for life in the upper soils and dry leaf litter through which they slide using Lateral undulation as a form of locomotive action, giving rise to their nickname as sliders. They normally emerge of a night-time to hunt for small Invertebrates such as ants, termites and insects. If disturbed, they dive immediately into any loose substrate to avoid predation, this behavior leaves behind a distinctive disrupted wavy track that often found on sandy flats or dunes, roads and tracks.

== Description ==
Lerista timida are elongated smooth-scaled, fossorial lizards that grows to an average snout-vent length of 45mm. They have 4 whitish limbs that are variable in length, the forelimb can be about 5-15% and hindlimb about 15-30% of snout-vent length. They are distinguished from other members of its genus as each limb has 3 digits, 5 supraciliary scales, fused frontoparietal scales, 20 rows of scales at mid body and a fused lower eyelid that covers a dark eye. It can be found in greyish brown to bronze colour with commonly 4 narrow, longitudinal blackish lines which can be composed of a series of dots spanning along the back. There is commonly a dark upper lateral stripe, spanning from the contracting or separated nostril, through the eye and above the ear along to the end of the tail. This stripe may be reduced to a dark zone formed by a large concentration of blackish flecks. The blackish flecks are seen across the body which is a uniform pale brown accompanied by black-edged scales. The lower lateral surface is greyish composed with dark flecks, the belly is a light grey to white colour with darker reticulations and the tail may have a dull yellowish colouring on the underside.

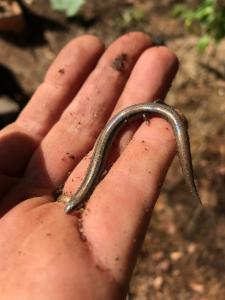
Adult Lerista Timida

== Distribution and habitat ==
Lerista timida can be found from the blue mountain regions of NSW to southeast Western Australia. it is found to inhabit the dry interiors of QLD, NSW, VIC, SA and WA. The population is known to inhabit parts of the Northern Territory with populations being found close to Alice Springs. Its southern population is in north-western Victoria and Populations have been recorded in Port Hedland WA and north of Mt. Isa Qld.

This species is occasionally active on the surface and can be found in a range of habitats from open woodlands to grasslands and dry and in dry and arid areas. It is commonly found under rocks, logs and leaf litter in various forest, woodland and shrubland communities where it forages for small invertebrates. During cool sunny weather the lizards are found to occupy exposed patches of leaf litter as a form of temperature regulation and when temperatures become hot they are often found in shaded environments or around the base of low vegetation.

== Reproduction ==
Lerista timida are oviparous reptiles with the females producing a single clutch of two eggs in late spring.

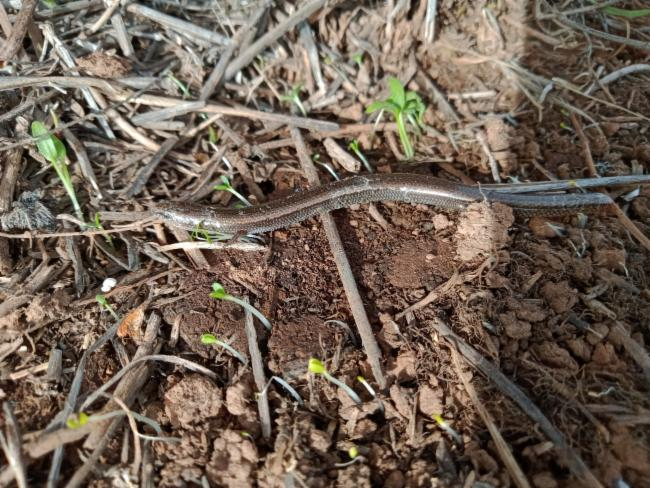
Lerista Timida sunbaking amongst leaf litter

== Conservation status ==
Lerista timida is listed as endangered in Victoria due to the extent of development in its preferred habitat and of least concern in QLD, NSW, SA and NT but it is still subjectable to general threats such as habitat loss from land clearing, habitat degradation by introduced species such as cattle and sheep, global warming, feral predators such as dogs, cats, pigs, foxes, road deaths and emerging diseases.

== Evolution ==
The family Scincidae has bodies that are elongated and flattened with shortened or removed limbs and digits allowing them to easily penetrate soil allowing them to dwell beneath the ground. These fossorial habits may have formed due to an increase in seasonally dry and arid habitats resulting in the emergence of the Lerista genus. The scales have evolved to be relatively smooth which allows them to slip easily through the upper soil layers. The reduction in limbs could have been a consequence of the adoption of lateral undulation as a significant locomotive action.

== Similar species ==
Lerista Muelleri was a species that was previously confused with Lerista timida but it is confined to northern western Australia and recognized as its own species. A species similar in body size and colouring is Mentia greyii, which has 4 fingers and 5 toes, Lerista timida has 3 toes and 3 fingers. The Lerista genus has the same number of toes as fingers differing from the Anomalopus genus and a tiny ear opening which differs them from the Hemiergis genus
