= North-eastern orange-tailed slider =

There are two species of skink named north-eastern orange-tailed slider:

- Lerista orientalis, found in the Northern Territory and Queensland in Australia
- Lerista zonulata, found in Queensland in Australia
