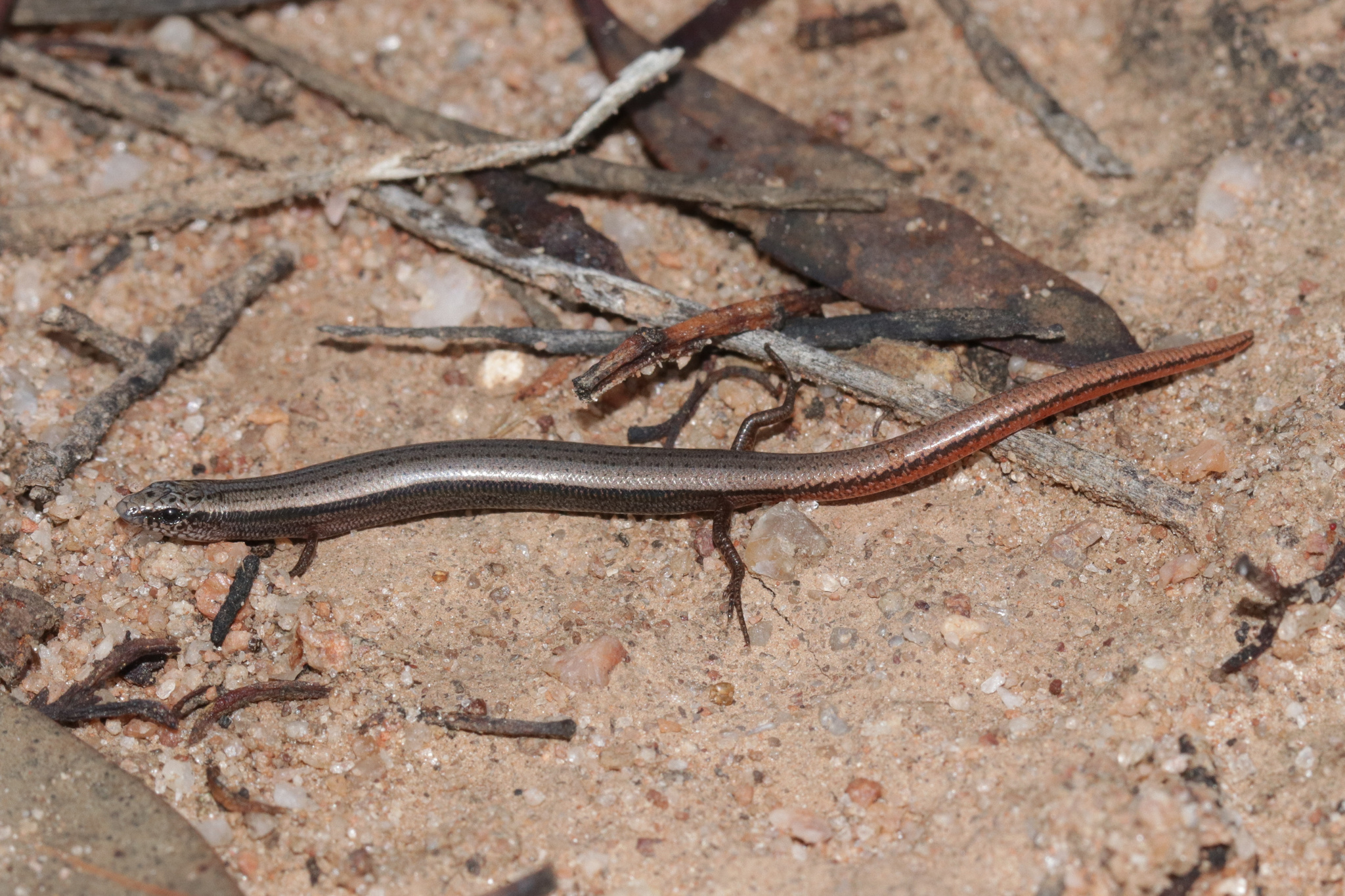

Conservation status
- Least Concern (IUCN 3.1)

Scientific classification
- Kingdom: Animalia
- Phylum: Chordata
- Class: Reptilia
- Order: Squamata
- Family: Scincidae
- Genus: Lerista
- Species: L. kingi

Binomial name
- Lerista kingi L.A. Smith & Adams, 2007

= Lerista kingi =

Species of lizard

Lerista kingi, commonly known as King's slider and King's three-toed slider, is a species of skink, in the family Scincidae. The species is endemic to the Australian state of Western Australia.

== Etymology ==
The specific name, kingi, is in honor of Australian herpetologist Dennis King (1942–2002).

== Description ==
L. kingi has three digits on each of its four feet. Adults usually have a snout-to-vent length (SVL) of about 4.5 cm (1.8 in) and are brown dorsally. It has a fused lower eyelid, paired frontoparietal scales, and five supraciliary scales.

== Habitat ==
The preferred natural habitats of L. kingi are shrubland and savanna.

== Reproduction ==
L. kingi is oviparous.
