= Lerista jacksoni =

Conservation status
- Least Concern (IUCN 3.1)

Scientific classification
- Kingdom: Animalia
- Phylum: Chordata
- Class: Reptilia
- Order: Squamata
- Family: Scincidae
- Genus: Lerista
- Species: L. jacksoni

Binomial name
- Lerista jacksoni L.A. Smith & Adams, 2007

Species of lizard

Lerista jacksoni, also known commonly as Jackson's lerista, Jackson's slider, and Jackson's three-toed slider, is a species of skink, a lizard in the family Scincidae. The species is endemic to the Australian state of Western Australia.

== Etymology ==
The specific name, jacksoni, is in honor of Gregory Jackson who is a layout artist for the Western Australian Museum.

== Habitat ==
The preferred natural habitat of L. jacksoni is rocky areas.

== Description ==
L. jacksoni has three digits on each of its four feet. It has four supraciliaries, paired frontoparietals, and a fused lower eyelid. It may attain a snout-to-vent length (SVL) of 4.3 cm (1.7 in).

== Behavior ==
L. jacksoni is terrestrial and saxicolous.

== Reproduction ==
L. jacksoni is oviparous.
