= Lerista kendricki =

Conservation status
- Least Concern (IUCN 3.1)

Scientific classification
- Kingdom: Animalia
- Phylum: Chordata
- Class: Reptilia
- Order: Squamata
- Family: Scincidae
- Genus: Lerista
- Species: L. kendricki

Binomial name
- Lerista kendricki Storr, 1991

Species of lizard

Lerista kendricki, also known commonly as the dark broad-blazed slider and the Shark Bay broad-striped slider, is a species of skink, a lizard in the subfamily Sphenomorphinae of the family Scincidae. The species is endemic to the Australian state of Western Australia.

== Etymology ==
The specific name, kendricki, is in honor of Australian zoologist Peter G. Kendrick.

== Description ==
L. kendricki has no front legs, and each small, slender back leg has only two digits.

The lower eyelid is fused. The dark broad vertebral stripe is continuous with the dark top of the head. Maximum snout-to-vent length (SVL) is 6.7 cm (2.6 in).

== Habitat ==
The preferred natural habitat of L. kendricki is sandy shrubland.

== Behavior ==
L. kendricki is terrestrial and fossorial.

== Reproduction ==
L. kendricki is oviparous.

== Taxonomy ==
L. kendricki belongs to the Lerista nichollsi species group.
