= Spotted broad-blazed slider =

There are two species of skink named spotted broad-blazed slider:

- Lerista uniduo
- Lerista stictopleura
