= Lerista parameles =

Scientific classification
- Domain: Eukaryota
- Kingdom: Animalia
- Phylum: Chordata
- Class: Reptilia
- Order: Squamata
- Family: Scincidae
- Genus: Lerista
- Species: L. parameles

Binomial name
- Lerista parameles Amey, Couper, & Worthington Wilmer, 2019

Species of lizard

The Chillagoe fine-lined slider (Lerista parameles) is a species of skink found in Queensland in Australia.
