= Lerista vanderduysi =

Conservation status
- Near Threatened (IUCN 3.1)

Scientific classification
- Kingdom: Animalia
- Phylum: Chordata
- Class: Reptilia
- Order: Squamata
- Suborder: Scinciformata
- Infraorder: Scincomorpha
- Family: Sphenomorphidae
- Genus: Lerista
- Species: L. vanderduysi

Binomial name
- Lerista vanderduysi Amey, Couper, & Worthington Wilmer, 2016

Species of lizard

The leaden-bellied fine-lined slider (Lerista vanderduysi) is a species of skink found in Queensland in Australia.
