= Lerista anyara =

Scientific classification
- Kingdom: Animalia
- Phylum: Chordata
- Class: Reptilia
- Order: Squamata
- Family: Scincidae
- Genus: Lerista
- Species: L. anyara

Binomial name
- Lerista anyara Amey, Couper, & Worthington Wilmer, 2019

Species of lizard

Lerista anyara, the Olkola slider skink, is a species of skink found in Queensland in Australia.
