= Lerista alia =

Scientific classification
- Kingdom: Animalia
- Phylum: Chordata
- Class: Reptilia
- Order: Squamata
- Family: Scincidae
- Genus: Lerista
- Species: L. alia

Binomial name
- Lerista alia Amey, Couper, & Worthington Wilmer, 2019

Species of lizard

The Bulleringa fine-lined slider (Lerista alia) is a species of skink found in Queensland in Australia.
