= Lerista punctatovittata =

Conservation status
- Least Concern (IUCN 3.1)

Scientific classification
- Kingdom: Animalia
- Phylum: Chordata
- Class: Reptilia
- Order: Squamata
- Suborder: Scinciformata
- Infraorder: Scincomorpha
- Family: Sphenomorphidae
- Genus: Lerista
- Species: L. punctatovittata

Binomial name
- Lerista punctatovittata (Günther, 1867)

Species of Australian lizard

The eastern robust slider (Lerista punctatovittata) is a nocturnal, burrowing species of skink found in continental Australia. Other common names are 'spotted lerista', and 'common burrowing skink'. The earliest written description of the species (under the scientific name Rhodona punctato-vittata) was provided by Albert Günther in 1867, based on a specimen caught in Queensland.

== Description ==
The average length of the body is around 8.5cm, up to a maximum of 10.5cm. Body colour may be grey, olive or shades of brown, patterned with several longitudinal bands of brown or black spots. The ear opening is small, but should be visible on close examination.

The limbs and toes are very small, with the hindlimbs having two toes (didactyl). Usually the forelimbs have only one toe (monodactyl), although two toes on the forelimb have been noted in a small number of individuals in southern areas. It may be difficult to distinguish these two-toed forelimb individuals from another similar skink species: Lerista emmotti.

== Distribution ==
Distribution of Lerista punctatovittata within Australia

Found within a variety of semi-arid and sandy habitats such as dry forests, open woodlands, mulga and mallee scrub; from the south-east of South Australia through north-western Victoria and New South Wales into the southern interior of Queensland.

== Habit ==
L. punctatovittata is not usually found on the surface, but burrows within sand or soil close to the surface under logs, woody debris and rocks. They are easier to locate when soil is moist after rain. They are nocturnal and emerge at night to feed on the surface; diet consists of ants, termites and other small insects. As per descriptions of the Lerista genus, when disturbed they will immediately burrow back into loose sand or soil. This produces distinctive, wavy tracks on the surface of dunes and other sandy areas.

== Vulnerability to climate change ==
Land-based reptiles are cited as being particularly vulnerable to climate change. In a 2015 study modelling the vulnerability of Australian skinks to climate change, Lerista punctatovittata was placed in a 'not threatened' vulnerability group. Protective factors for L. punctatovittata were: non-threatened conservation status, habitat generalist, non-specialised dietary requirements, non-temperature dependent sex determination, and clutch/litter size (average litter 3.3).

A 2019 study modeled the effects of climate and other variables on 8 Australian desert reptiles, including L. punctatovittata, based on measurements and observations conducted in north-west New South Wales over a 30-year period. Subterranean species including L. punctatovittata were found to be more vulnerable to flooding. Interestingly, overall body condition of skinks in this study improved when the temperature was over 45°C for extended periods.
