= Lerista gerrardii =

Conservation status
- Least Concern (IUCN 3.1)

Scientific classification
- Kingdom: Animalia
- Phylum: Chordata
- Class: Reptilia
- Order: Squamata
- Suborder: Scinciformata
- Infraorder: Scincomorpha
- Family: Sphenomorphidae
- Genus: Lerista
- Species: L. gerrardii

Binomial name
- Lerista gerrardii (Gray, 1864)

Species of lizard

The bold-striped robust slider (Lerista gerrardii) is a species of skink found in Western Australia.
