= Lerista nichollsi =

Conservation status
- Least Concern (IUCN 3.1)

Scientific classification
- Kingdom: Animalia
- Phylum: Chordata
- Class: Reptilia
- Order: Squamata
- Family: Scincidae
- Genus: Lerista
- Species: L. nichollsi

Binomial name
- Lerista nichollsi (Loveridge, 1933)

Synonyms
- Rhodona nichollsi Loveridge, 1933; Lygosoma nichollsi (Loveridge, 1933)

Species of lizard

Lerista nichollsi, also known commonly as the inland broad-blazed slider, the inland broad-striped slider, and Nicholls' lerista, is a species of lizard in the subfamily Sphenomorphinae of the family Scincidae (skinks). The species is endemic to the Australian state of Western Australia.

== Etymology ==
The specific name, nichollsi, is in honor of Australian biologist George Edward Nicholls (1877–1953).

== Description ==
Adults of Lerista nichollsi have a snout-to-vent length (SVL) of about 7 cm (2.8 in). The front legs are absent, and each small back leg has only two digits. The lower eyelid is immovably fused, and it has a transparent "spectacle". There are four supraciliary scales.

== Habitat ==
The preferred natural habitat of Lerista nichollsi is shrubland.

== Behaviour ==
Lerista nichollsi is terrestrial, sheltering in leaf litter and sandy soil, beneath shrubs.

== Reproduction ==
Lerista nichollsi is oviparous.
