= Lerista colliveri =

Conservation status
- Near Threatened (IUCN 3.1)

Scientific classification
- Kingdom: Animalia
- Phylum: Chordata
- Class: Reptilia
- Order: Squamata
- Family: Scincidae
- Genus: Lerista
- Species: L. colliveri

Binomial name
- Lerista colliveri Couper & Ingram, 1992

Species of lizard

Lerista colliveri, nubbinned fine-lined slider, is a species of skink, a lizard in the family Scincidae. The species is endemic to Queensland in Australia.

== Etymology ==
The specific name, colliveri, is in honor of Frederick Stanley "Stan" Colliver (1908–1991), who was an Australian geologist and malacologist.

== Habitat ==
The preferred natural habitats of L. colliveri are forest and savanna.

== Description ==
Large for its genus, L. colliveri may attain a snout-to-vent length (SVL) of 8.4 cm (3.3 in), and a tail length of 12.7 cm (5.0 in). It has very reduced limbs. Each rear leg has only one digit, which has a claw, but each front leg is only a clawless "nubbin".

== Behavior ==
L. colliveri is terrestrial and fossorial.

== Reproduction ==
L. colliveri is oviparous.
