= Lerista storri =

Conservation status
- Critically Endangered (IUCN 3.1)

Scientific classification
- Kingdom: Animalia
- Phylum: Chordata
- Class: Reptilia
- Order: Squamata
- Family: Scincidae
- Genus: Lerista
- Species: L. storri

Binomial name
- Lerista storri Greer, McDonald, & Lawrie, 1983

Species of lizard

Lerista storri, commonly known as the Mount Surprise slider or Storr's lerista, is a species of lizard in the family Scincidae. The species is endemic to Australia.

== Etymology ==
The specific name, storri, is in honour of Australian herpetologist Glen Milton Storr.

== Geographic range ==
L. storri is found in Queensland in Australia.

== Habitat ==
The preferred natural habitat of L. storri is eucalypt woodlands.

== Description ==
L. storri has no front legs. The back legs are rudimentary, short, and styliform.

== Behaviour ==
L. storri locomotes by "sand swimming".

== Reproduction ==
L. storri is oviparous.
