= Lerista distinguenda =

Conservation status
- Least Concern (IUCN 3.1)

Scientific classification
- Kingdom: Animalia
- Phylum: Chordata
- Class: Reptilia
- Order: Squamata
- Suborder: Scinciformata
- Infraorder: Scincomorpha
- Family: Sphenomorphidae
- Genus: Lerista
- Species: L. distinguenda

Binomial name
- Lerista distinguenda (Werner, 1910)

Species of lizard

The south-western orange-tailed slider (Lerista distinguenda) is a species of skink found in Western Australia.
