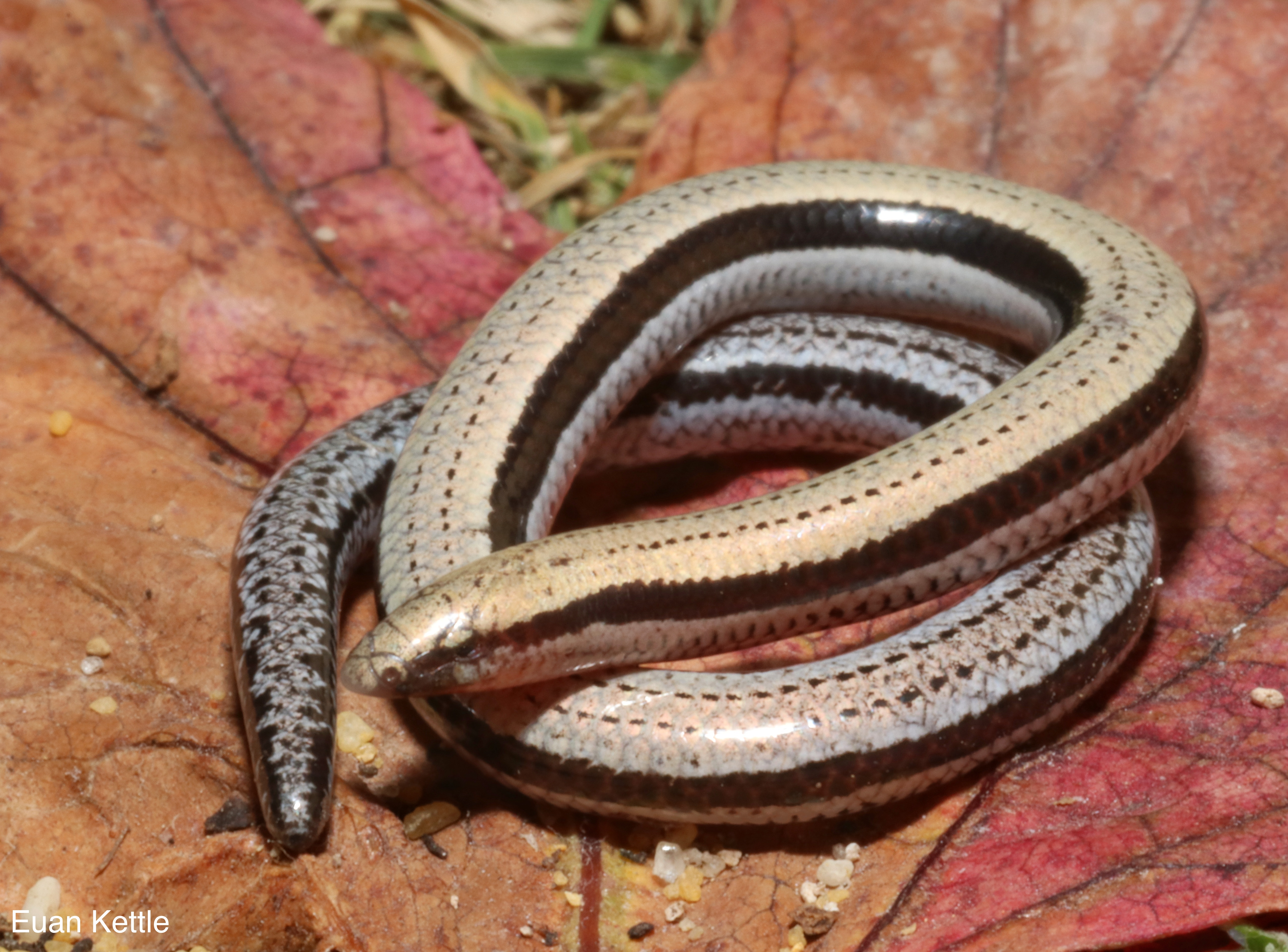

Conservation status
- Least Concern (IUCN 3.1)

Scientific classification
- Kingdom: Animalia
- Phylum: Chordata
- Class: Reptilia
- Order: Squamata
- Suborder: Scinciformata
- Infraorder: Scincomorpha
- Family: Sphenomorphidae
- Genus: Lerista
- Species: L. praepedita

Binomial name
- Lerista praepedita (Boulenger, 1887)
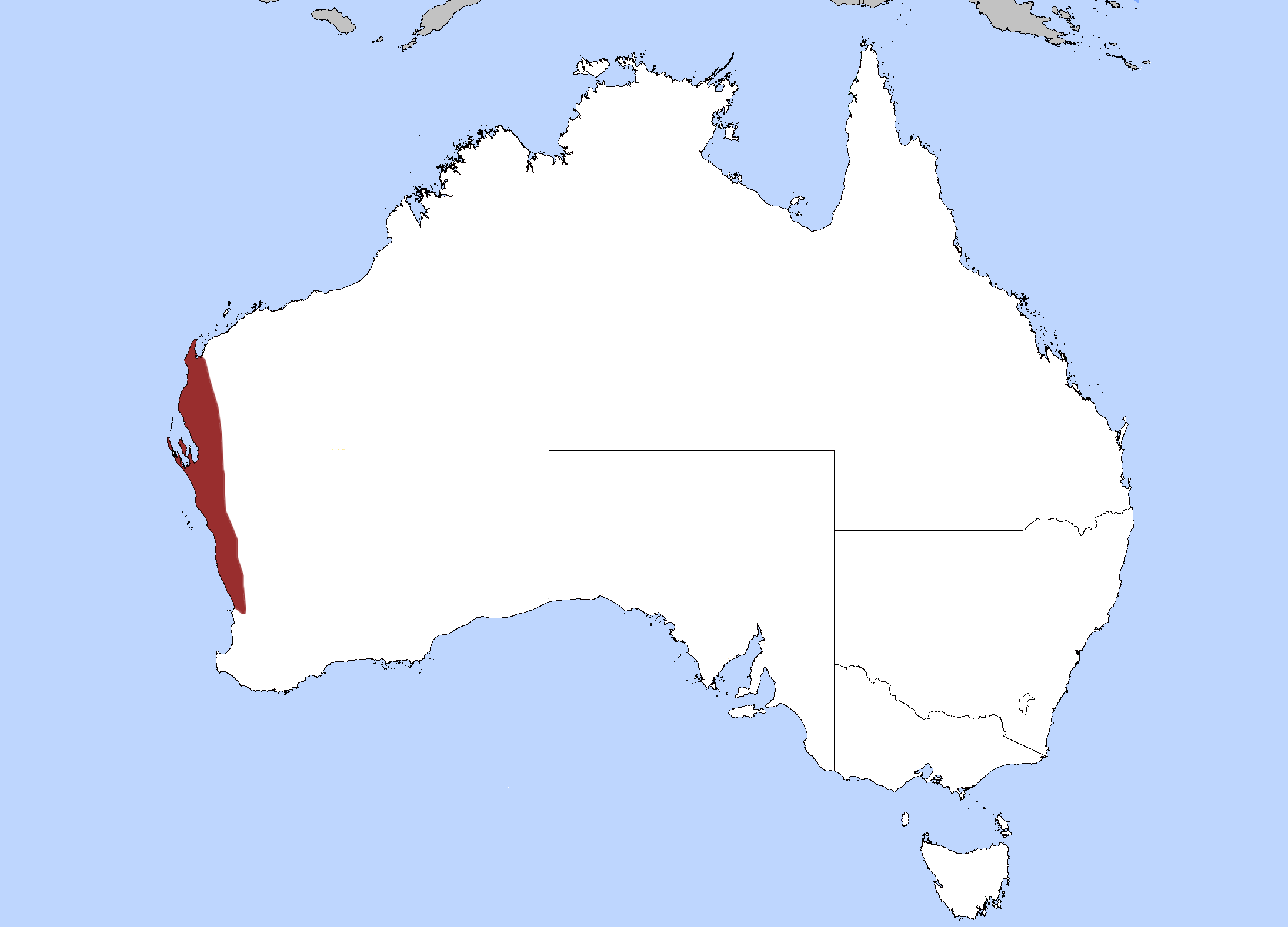
- Distribution of the Western Worm Lerista

= Western worm lerista =

Species of lizard

The western worm lerista or blunt-tailed west-coast slider (Lerista praepedita) is a species of skink native to coastal areas of southwest and midwest Western Australia. It is found amongst heath and woodlands on coastal dunes.

It is very thin, with no front legs and extremely small, stumpy back legs. It is a pale grey or brown, with a prominent, broad, dark brown stripe along each side, and a series of small brown dashes along its back.
