= Lerista carpentariae =

Conservation status
- Least Concern (IUCN 3.1)

Scientific classification
- Kingdom: Animalia
- Phylum: Chordata
- Class: Reptilia
- Order: Squamata
- Suborder: Scinciformata
- Infraorder: Scincomorpha
- Family: Sphenomorphidae
- Genus: Lerista
- Species: L. carpentariae

Binomial name
- Lerista carpentariae Greer, 1983

Species of lizard

The Carpentaria fine-lined slider (Lerista carpentariae) is a species of skink found in the Northern Territory in Australia, Groot Eylandt and the Sir Edward Pellew group. It receives its name after the type locality in the gulf of Carpentaria.
