= Lerista desertorum =

Conservation status
- Least Concern (IUCN 3.1)

Scientific classification
- Kingdom: Animalia
- Phylum: Chordata
- Class: Reptilia
- Order: Squamata
- Suborder: Scinciformata
- Infraorder: Scincomorpha
- Family: Sphenomorphidae
- Genus: Lerista
- Species: L. desertorum

Binomial name
- Lerista desertorum (Sternfeld, 1919)

Species of lizard

The Central Deserts robust slider (Lerista desertorum) is a species of skink found in Northern Territory, South Australia, and Western Australia.
