= Lerista ameles =

Conservation status
- Endangered (IUCN 3.1)

Scientific classification
- Kingdom: Animalia
- Phylum: Chordata
- Class: Reptilia
- Order: Squamata
- Suborder: Scinciformata
- Infraorder: Scincomorpha
- Family: Sphenomorphidae
- Genus: Lerista
- Species: L. ameles

Binomial name
- Lerista ameles Greer, 1979

Species of lizard

The limbless fine-lined slider (Lerista ameles) is a species of skink found in Queensland in Australia.
