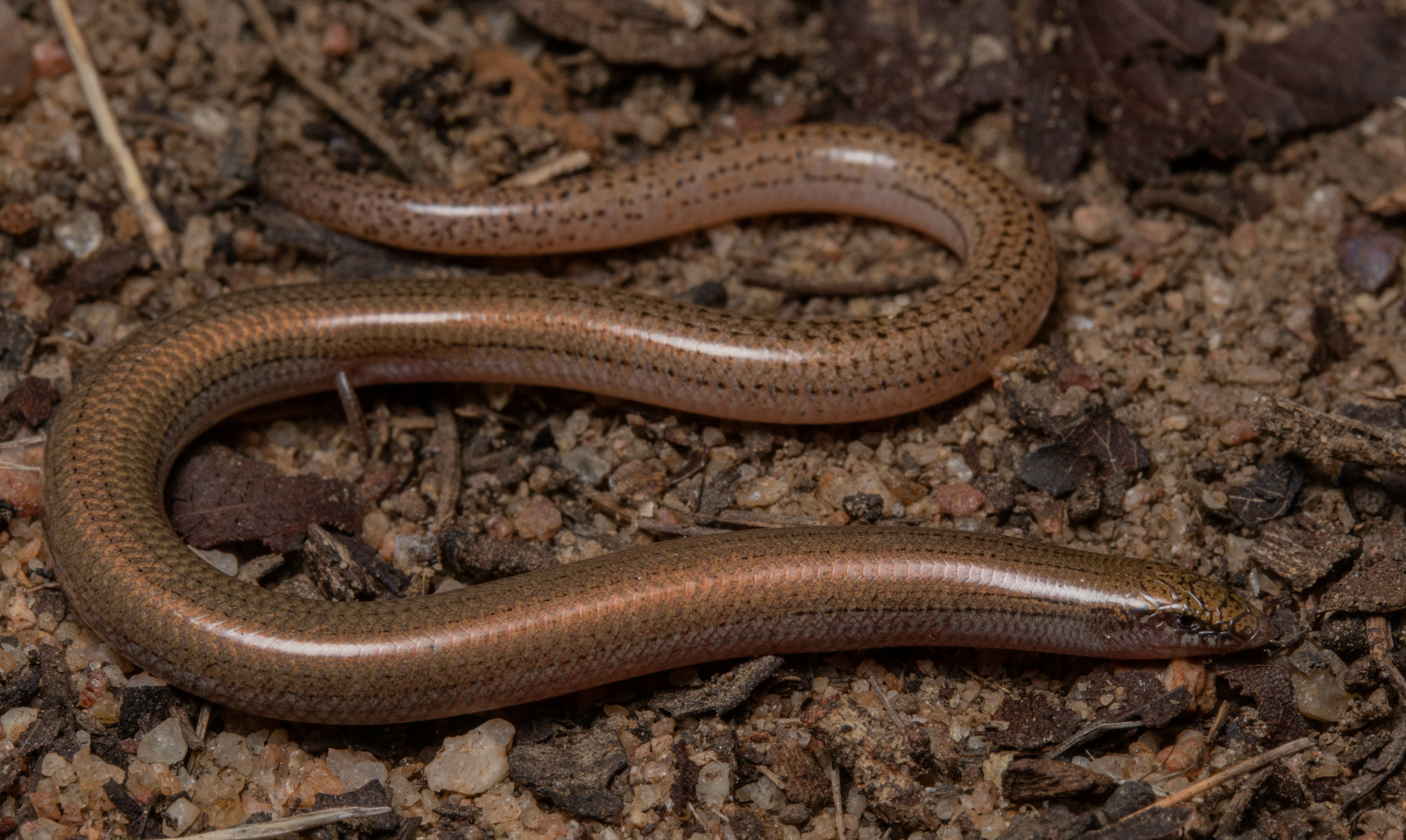
- L. cinerea in Dalrymple, Queensland, Australia

Conservation status
- Near Threatened (IUCN 3.1)

Scientific classification
- Kingdom: Animalia
- Phylum: Chordata
- Class: Reptilia
- Order: Squamata
- Family: Scincidae
- Genus: Lerista
- Species: L. cinerea

Binomial name
- Lerista cinerea Greer, McDonald, & Lawrie, 1983

= Lerista cinerea =

Species of lizard

Lerista cinerea, the vine-thicket fine-lined slider, is a species of skink found in Queensland, Australia.
