= Lerista elongata =

Conservation status
- Least Concern (IUCN 3.1)

Scientific classification
- Kingdom: Animalia
- Phylum: Chordata
- Class: Reptilia
- Order: Squamata
- Suborder: Scinciformata
- Infraorder: Scincomorpha
- Family: Sphenomorphidae
- Genus: Lerista
- Species: L. elongata

Binomial name
- Lerista elongata Storr, 1990
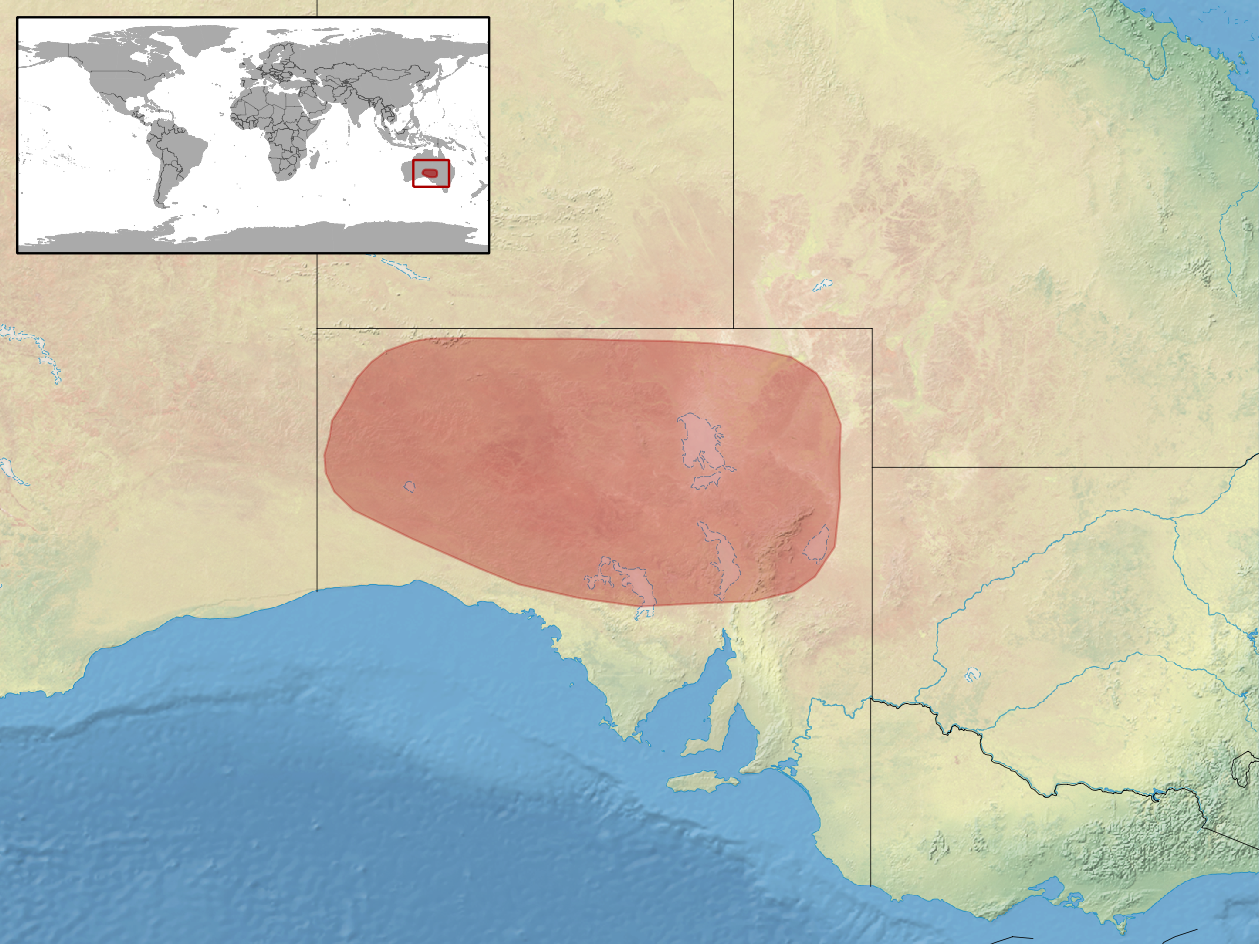

Species of lizard

The wide-striped mulch slider (Lerista elongata) is a species of skink found in South Australia.
