= Lerista chordae =

Conservation status
- Vulnerable (IUCN 3.1)

Scientific classification
- Kingdom: Animalia
- Phylum: Chordata
- Class: Reptilia
- Order: Squamata
- Suborder: Scinciformata
- Infraorder: Scincomorpha
- Family: Sphenomorphidae
- Genus: Lerista
- Species: L. chordae

Binomial name
- Lerista chordae Amey, Kutt, & Hutchinson, 2005

Species of lizard

The lyre-patterned slider (Lerista chordae) is a species of skink found in Queensland in Australia.
