= Lerista stylis =

Conservation status
- Least Concern (IUCN 3.1)

Scientific classification
- Kingdom: Animalia
- Phylum: Chordata
- Class: Reptilia
- Order: Squamata
- Suborder: Scinciformata
- Infraorder: Scincomorpha
- Family: Sphenomorphidae
- Genus: Lerista
- Species: L. stylis

Binomial name
- Lerista stylis (Mitchell, 1955)
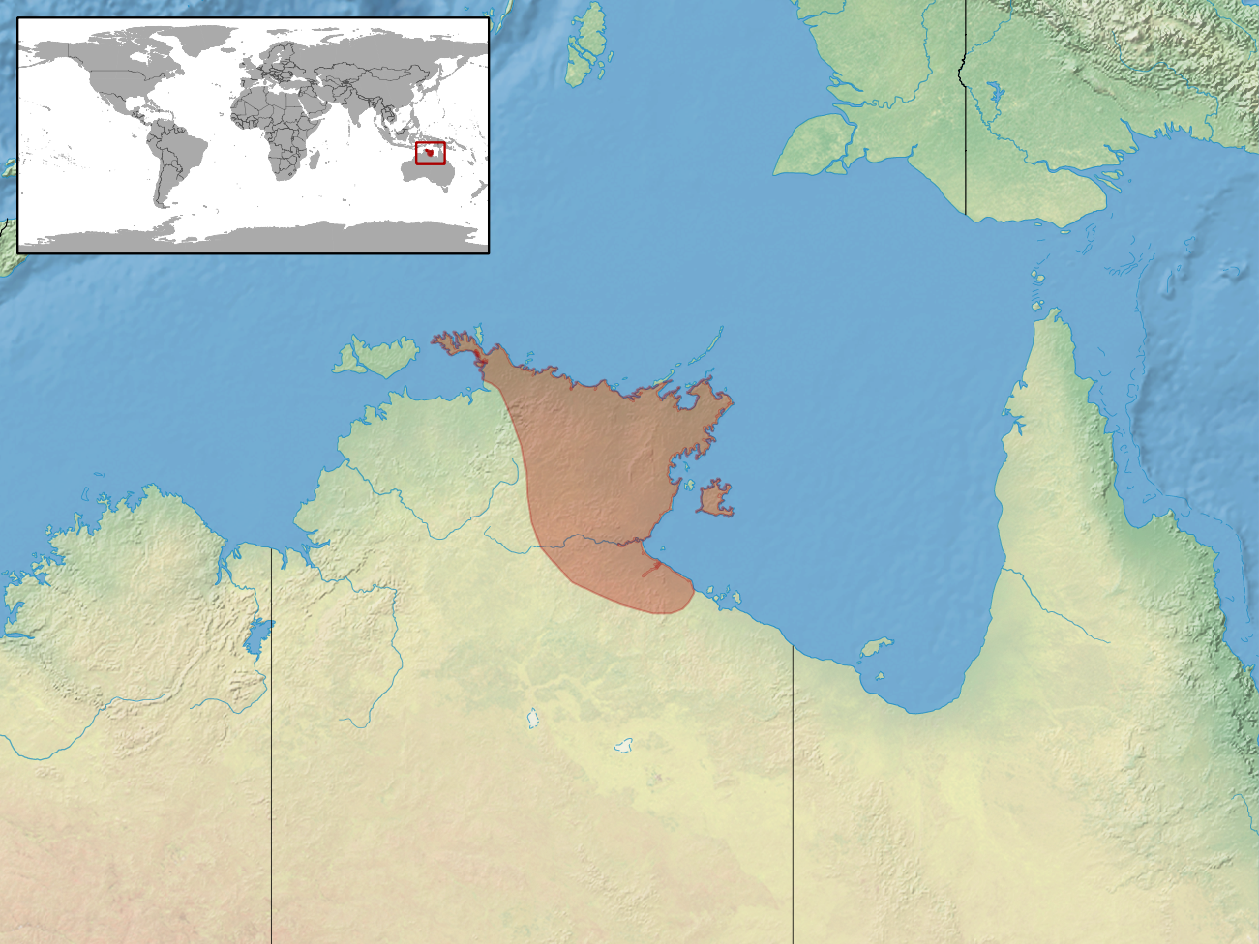

Species of lizard

The Arnhem Coast fine-lined slider (Lerista stylis) is a species of skink found in the Northern Territory and Queensland in Australia.
