= Lerista miopus =

Scientific classification
- Domain: Eukaryota
- Kingdom: Animalia
- Phylum: Chordata
- Class: Reptilia
- Order: Squamata
- Family: Scincidae
- Genus: Lerista
- Species: L. miopus

Binomial name
- Lerista miopus (Günther, 1867)

Species of lizard

Lerista miopus is a species of skink found in Western Australia.
