= Lerista gascoynensis =

Conservation status
- Least Concern (IUCN 3.1)

Scientific classification
- Kingdom: Animalia
- Phylum: Chordata
- Class: Reptilia
- Order: Squamata
- Suborder: Scinciformata
- Infraorder: Scincomorpha
- Family: Sphenomorphidae
- Genus: Lerista
- Species: L. gascoynensis

Binomial name
- Lerista gascoynensis Storr, 1986

Species of lizard

The Gascoyne broad-blazed slider (Lerista gascoynensis) is a species of skink found in Western Australia.
