= Lerista eupoda =

Conservation status
- Least Concern (IUCN 3.1)

Scientific classification
- Kingdom: Animalia
- Phylum: Chordata
- Class: Reptilia
- Order: Squamata
- Family: Scincidae
- Genus: Lerista
- Species: L. eupoda

Binomial name
- Lerista eupoda Smith, 1996

Species of lizard

The Meekatharra slider (Lerista eupoda) is a species of lizard from the genus Lerista of the family Scincidae, described by Smith in 1996. According to Catalogue of Life Lerista eupoda do not have known subspecies.

== Distribution ==
14 km north-northeast of Cue, Australia.
