= Lerista microtis =

Conservation status
- Least Concern (IUCN 3.1)

Scientific classification
- Kingdom: Animalia
- Phylum: Chordata
- Class: Reptilia
- Order: Squamata
- Suborder: Scinciformata
- Infraorder: Scincomorpha
- Family: Sphenomorphidae
- Genus: Lerista
- Species: L. microtis

Binomial name
- Lerista microtis (Gray, 1845)

Species of lizard

The south-western slider (Lerista microtis) is a species of skink found in South Australia and Western Australia.
