= Lerista clara =

Conservation status
- Least Concern (IUCN 3.1)

Scientific classification
- Kingdom: Animalia
- Phylum: Chordata
- Class: Reptilia
- Order: Squamata
- Suborder: Scinciformata
- Infraorder: Scincomorpha
- Family: Sphenomorphidae
- Genus: Lerista
- Species: L. clara

Binomial name
- Lerista clara Smith & Adams, 2007

Species of lizard

The sharp-blazed three-toed slider (Lerista clara) is a species of skink found in Western Australia.
