= Lerista varia =

Conservation status
- Least Concern (IUCN 3.1)

Scientific classification
- Kingdom: Animalia
- Phylum: Chordata
- Class: Reptilia
- Order: Squamata
- Family: Scincidae
- Genus: Lerista
- Species: L. varia

Binomial name
- Lerista varia Storr, 1986

Species of lizard

The Shark Bay broad-blazed slider (Lerista varia) is a species of skink found in Western Australia. It was described by Storr in 1986.
