= Lerista amicorum =

Conservation status
- Least Concern (IUCN 3.1)

Scientific classification
- Kingdom: Animalia
- Phylum: Chordata
- Class: Reptilia
- Order: Squamata
- Family: Scincidae
- Genus: Lerista
- Species: L. amicorum

Binomial name
- Lerista amicorum L.A. Smith & M. Adams, 2007

Species of lizard

The Fortescue three-toed slider (Lerista amicorum) is a species of skink, a lizard in the family Scincidae. The species is endemic to Australia.

== Etymology ==
The specific name, amicorum (which means "of the friends" in Latin), is in honor of Australian zoologists (and friends), William Henry "Harry" Butler and Athol M. Douglas, both of whom collected the first specimens in 1964.

== Geographic range ==
L. amicorum is found in the Australian state of Western Australia.

== Habitat ==
The preferred natural habitats of L. amicorum are grassland and savanna.

== Description ==
L. amicorum has three toes on each of its four feet.

== Reproduction ==
L. amicorum is oviparous.
