= Lerista griffini =

Conservation status
- Least Concern (IUCN 3.1)

Scientific classification
- Kingdom: Animalia
- Phylum: Chordata
- Class: Reptilia
- Order: Squamata
- Family: Scincidae
- Genus: Lerista
- Species: L. griffini

Binomial name
- Lerista griffini Storr, 1982

Species of lizard

Lerista griffini, also known commonly as Griffin's lerista and the stout sandslider, is a species of skink, a lizard in the family Scincidae. The species is endemic to Australia.

== Etymology ==
The specific name, griffini, is in honour of English-Australian herpetologist Philip Griffin.

== Geographic range ==
In Australia L. griffini is found in the Northern Territory and in the state of Western Australia.

== Habitat ==
The preferred natural habitat of L. griffini is sandy areas of savanna, shrubland, and grassland.

== Description ==
L. griffini has back legs, but no front legs. Each back leg has two toes.

== Behaviour ==
L. griffini is terrestrial and fossorial.

== Reproduction ==
L. griffini is oviparous.
