= Lerista rolfei =

Conservation status
- Least Concern (IUCN 3.1)

Scientific classification
- Kingdom: Animalia
- Phylum: Chordata
- Class: Reptilia
- Order: Squamata
- Suborder: Scinciformata
- Infraorder: Scincomorpha
- Family: Sphenomorphidae
- Genus: Lerista
- Species: L. rolfei

Binomial name
- Lerista rolfei Smith & Adams, 2007

Species of lizard

Rolfe's three-toed slider or Rolfe's slider (Lerista rolfei) is a species of skink found in Western Australia.
