= Lerista karlschmidti =

Conservation status
- Least Concern (IUCN 3.1)

Scientific classification
- Kingdom: Animalia
- Phylum: Chordata
- Class: Reptilia
- Order: Squamata
- Family: Scincidae
- Genus: Lerista
- Species: L. karlschmidti

Binomial name
- Lerista karlschmidti (Marx & Hosmer, 1959)

Synonyms
- Rhodona karlschmidti Marx & Hosmer, 1959; Lerista karlschmidti — Greer, 1967

Species of lizard

Lerista karlschmidti, also known commonly as the lesser robust fine-lined slider, Karl's lerista, and Karl Schmidt's lerista, is a species of skink, a lizard in the subfamily Sphenomorphinae of the family Scincidae. The species is native to the Northern Territory and Queensland in Australia. Its range is highly disjunct and it is likely that only the Queensland population (not seen after its original collection) represents L. karlschmidti, while the Northern Territory population is a distinct species.

== Etymology ==
The specific name, karlschmidti, is in honor of American herpetologist Karl Patterson Schmidt.

== Habitat ==
The preferred natural habitats of L. karlschmidti are sandy desert, rocky areas, and dry forest.

== Description ==
L. karlschmidti may attain a snout-to-vent length (SVL) of 7 cm (2.8 in). It has 16–20 scale rows at midbody, two loreal scales, but no superciliary scales. It has no front legs. Each back leg is a stump with one clawed digit.

== Reproduction ==
L. karlschmidti is oviparous, and breeds during the dry season.
