= Lerista yuna =

Conservation status
- Near Threatened (IUCN 3.1)

Scientific classification
- Kingdom: Animalia
- Phylum: Chordata
- Class: Reptilia
- Order: Squamata
- Family: Scincidae
- Genus: Lerista
- Species: L. yuna

Binomial name
- Lerista yuna Storr, 1991

Species of lizard

Lerista yuna, also known as the Yuna broad-blazed slider, is a species of skink. It is endemic to Western Australia. It occurs in semi-arid shrubland, probably burrowing in loose, sandy soils. It is oviparous.
