= Lerista terdigitata =

Conservation status
- Least Concern (IUCN 3.1)

Scientific classification
- Kingdom: Animalia
- Phylum: Chordata
- Class: Reptilia
- Order: Squamata
- Suborder: Scinciformata
- Infraorder: Scincomorpha
- Family: Sphenomorphidae
- Genus: Lerista
- Species: L. terdigitata

Binomial name
- Lerista terdigitata (Parker, 1926)

Species of lizard

The robust mulch-slider (Lerista terdigitata) is a species of skink found in South Australia and Western Australia.
