= Lerista axillaris =

Conservation status
- Data Deficient (IUCN 3.1)

Scientific classification
- Kingdom: Animalia
- Phylum: Chordata
- Class: Reptilia
- Order: Squamata
- Suborder: Scinciformata
- Infraorder: Scincomorpha
- Family: Sphenomorphidae
- Genus: Lerista
- Species: L. axillaris

Binomial name
- Lerista axillaris Storr, 1991

Species of lizard

The stripe-sided robust slider (Lerista axillaris) is a species of skink found in Western Australia.
