= Lerista greeri =

Conservation status
- Least Concern (IUCN 3.1)

Scientific classification
- Kingdom: Animalia
- Phylum: Chordata
- Class: Reptilia
- Order: Squamata
- Suborder: Scinciformata
- Infraorder: Scincomorpha
- Family: Sphenomorphidae
- Genus: Lerista
- Species: L. greeri

Binomial name
- Lerista greeri Storr, 1982

Species of lizard

The south-eastern Kimberley sandslider (Lerista greeri) is a species of skink found in Western Australia.
