= Lerista simillima =

Conservation status
- Least Concern (IUCN 3.1)

Scientific classification
- Kingdom: Animalia
- Phylum: Chordata
- Class: Reptilia
- Order: Squamata
- Suborder: Scinciformata
- Infraorder: Scincomorpha
- Family: Sphenomorphidae
- Genus: Lerista
- Species: L. simillima

Binomial name
- Lerista simillima Storr, 1984

Species of lizard

Lerista simillima, also known as the Fitzroy sandslider, is a species of skink. It is endemic to Western Australia. It is a fossorial species found in Acacia thickets and woodlands.
