= Lerista haroldi =

Conservation status
- Endangered (IUCN 3.1)

Scientific classification
- Kingdom: Animalia
- Phylum: Chordata
- Class: Reptilia
- Order: Squamata
- Family: Scincidae
- Genus: Lerista
- Species: L. haroldi

Binomial name
- Lerista haroldi Storr, 1983

Species of lizard

Lerista haroldi, also known commonly as the Gnaraloo mulch-slider and Harold's lerista, is a species of skink, a lizard in the family Scincidae. The species is native to the Australian state of Western Australia.

== Etymology ==
The specific name, haroldi, is in honor of Australian herpetologist Gregory Harold.

== Habitat ==
The preferred natural habitat of L. haroldi is grassland.

== Description ==
L. haroldi has three digits on each of its four feet.

== Reproduction ==
L. haroldi is oviparous.
