= Lerista baynesi =

Conservation status
- Least Concern (IUCN 3.1)

Scientific classification
- Kingdom: Animalia
- Phylum: Chordata
- Class: Reptilia
- Order: Squamata
- Family: Scincidae
- Genus: Lerista
- Species: L. baynesi

Binomial name
- Lerista baynesi Storr, 1971

Synonyms
- Lerista picturata baynesi Storr, 1971; Lerista baynesi — Storr, 1991

Species of lizard

Lerista baynesi, also known commonly as Baynes' lerista and Bayne's slider, is a species of skink, a lizard in the family Scincidae. The species is endemic to Australia.

== Etymology ==
The specific name, baynesi, is in honor of Alexander Baynes (born 1944), who is an Australian mammalogist and paleontologist.

== Geographic range ==
L. baynesi is found in the Australian states of South Australia and Western Australia.

== Habitat ==
The preferred natural habitats of L. baynesi are savanna and shrubland.

== Description ==
L. baynesi has no front legs, and very small hind legs. Each hind leg has two toes.

== Reproduction ==
L. baynesi is oviparous.
