= Allan's lerista =

Conservation status
- Critically Endangered (IUCN 3.1)

Scientific classification
- Kingdom: Animalia
- Phylum: Chordata
- Class: Reptilia
- Order: Squamata
- Family: Scincidae
- Genus: Lerista
- Species: L. allanae

Binomial name
- Lerista allanae (Longman, 1937)

Synonyms
- Rhodona allanae Longman, 1937; Lerista allanae — Greer, 1967; Gavisus allanae — Wells & Wellington, 1984; Lerista allanae — Cogger, 2000

Species of lizard

Allan's lerista (Lerista allanae), also known commonly as Allan's skink and the greater robust fine-lined slider, is a species of skink, a lizard in the family Scincidae. This rare species is endemic to Queensland, Australia.

== Etymology ==
The specific name, allanae, is in honor of "Mrs. P.C. Allan" who presented many interesting specimens to the Queensland Museum.

== Habitat ==
The preferred natural habitat of L. allanae is forest.

== Description ==
L. allanae has its limbs much reduced. It has no front legs, and each of its back legs has only one digit. The digit bears a claw.

The maximum recorded snout-to-vent length (SVL) for L. allanae is 8.8 cm (3.5 in).

== Reproduction ==
L. allanae is oviparous.

== Conservation status ==
L. allanae is listed as "critically endangered" under the IUCN Red List, and as "endangered" on Queensland's Nature Conservation Act 1992.
