= Lerista viduata =

Conservation status
- Data Deficient (IUCN 3.1)

Scientific classification
- Kingdom: Animalia
- Phylum: Chordata
- Class: Reptilia
- Order: Squamata
- Family: Scincidae
- Genus: Lerista
- Species: L. viduata

Binomial name
- Lerista viduata Storr, 1991

Species of lizard

The Ravensthorpe Range slider (Lerista viduata) is a species of skink found in Western Australia. Historically rare and considered Data Deficient, it was known from only 15 collected specimens prior to a recent study.

== Size ==
The Ravensthorpe Range slider is small in size, with a Snout–vent length of approximately 45–47 mm.

== Taxonomy ==
The species was first described by the Australian herpetologist Glen Milton Storr in his 1991 paper Revision of Lerista microtis (Lacertilia: Scincidae).

== Geographic range and habitat ==
Lerista viduata is only found in the Ravensthorpe Range, near Ravensthorpe, and generally lives in loose soil, plant matter, and beneath rocks and logs.

== Breeding ==
They are oviparous.

== Conservation status ==
Although currently listed as Data Deficient on the IUCN Red List, a 2024 study published in the journal Pacific Conservation Biology found the species more accurately meets the criteria for Critically Endangered and estimated the population to be between 3,514–9,276 mature individuals. With an Extent of Occurrence of just 32 km^{2} (well below the 100 km^{2} threshold for Critically Endangered), fire remains the most significant threat for loss of habitat, and with bushfires common in the region, it is thought that a single large fire could significantly affect the population. Mining also poses a significant risk for loss of habitat.
