= Lerista robusta =

Conservation status
- Data Deficient (IUCN 3.1)

Scientific classification
- Kingdom: Animalia
- Phylum: Chordata
- Class: Reptilia
- Order: Squamata
- Suborder: Scinciformata
- Infraorder: Scincomorpha
- Family: Sphenomorphidae
- Genus: Lerista
- Species: L. robusta

Binomial name
- Lerista robusta Storr, 1990

Species of lizard

The brad-eyed sandslider (Lerista robusta) is a species of skink found in Western Australia.
