= Lerista fragilis =

Conservation status
- Least Concern (IUCN 3.1)

Scientific classification
- Kingdom: Animalia
- Phylum: Chordata
- Class: Reptilia
- Order: Squamata
- Suborder: Scinciformata
- Infraorder: Scincomorpha
- Family: Sphenomorphidae
- Genus: Lerista
- Species: L. fragilis

Binomial name
- Lerista fragilis (Günther, 1876)

Species of lizard

The eastern mulch-slider (Lerista fragilis) is a species of skink found in Queensland and Tasmania in Australia.
