= Lerista edwardsae =

Conservation status
- Least Concern (IUCN 3.1)

Scientific classification
- Kingdom: Animalia
- Phylum: Chordata
- Class: Reptilia
- Order: Squamata
- Family: Scincidae
- Genus: Lerista
- Species: L. edwardsae

Binomial name
- Lerista edwardsae Storr, 1982

Synonyms
- Lerista picturata edwardsae Storr, 1982; Lerista edwardsae — Storr, 1991

Species of lizard

Lerista edwardsae, also known commonly as the Myall slider, is a species of skink, a lizard in the family Scincidae. The species is endemic to the Australian state of South Australia.

== Etymology ==
The specific name, edwardsae, is in honor of Australian herpetologist Adrienne Edwards.

== Habitat ==
The preferred natural habitats of L. edwardsae are forest and shrubland.

== Description ==
L. edwardsae has no front legs, and each back leg has two digits.

== Reproduction ==
L. edwardsae is oviparous.
