= Lerista speciosa =

Conservation status
- Least Concern (IUCN 3.1)

Scientific classification
- Kingdom: Animalia
- Phylum: Chordata
- Class: Reptilia
- Order: Squamata
- Suborder: Scinciformata
- Infraorder: Scincomorpha
- Family: Sphenomorphidae
- Genus: Lerista
- Species: L. speciosa

Binomial name
- Lerista speciosa Storr, 1990

Species of lizard

The pale-striped mulch-slider (Lerista speciosa) is a species of skink found in South Australia.
