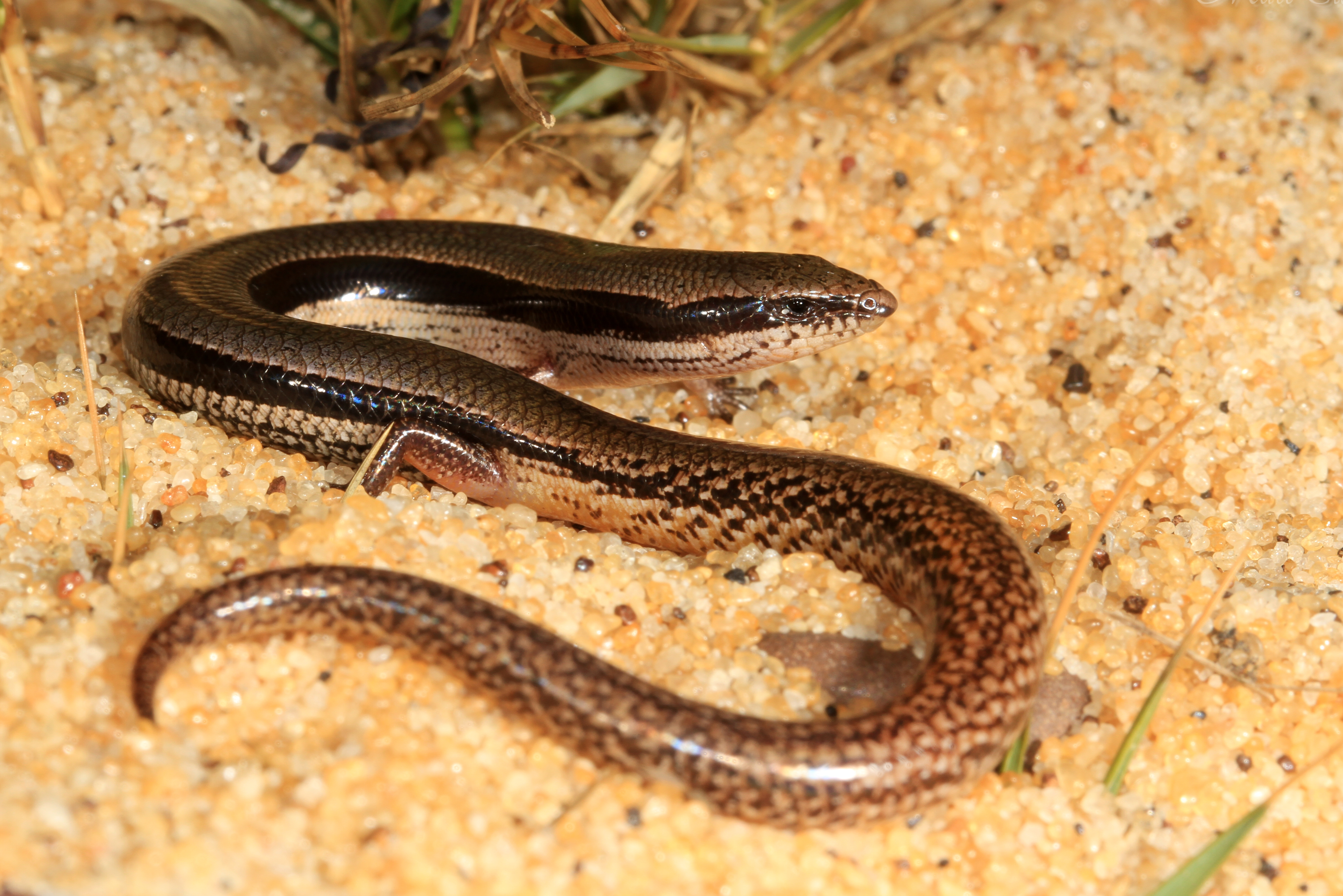
- South-eastern slider

Scientific classification
- Kingdom: Animalia
- Phylum: Chordata
- Class: Reptilia
- Order: Squamata
- Family: Scincidae
- Subfamily: Sphenomorphinae
- Genus: Lerista; Bell, 1833

Species
- See text

= Lerista =

Genus of lizards

Lerista is a diverse (~ 90 species) genus of skinks endemic to Australia, commonly known as sliders.

== Description ==
The genus is especially notable for the variation in the amount of limb reduction. The variation ranges from short-bodied forms with large legs bearing five toes, to elongate forms completely lacking legs. The body length of the lizards is 33–103 millimetres (1.3–4.1 in). Their locomotion is linked to their body shape. The shorter skinks with prominent limbs travel on the surface; the longer skinks with reduced legs tend to burrow more. A phylogenetic tree of Lerista, derived from DNA analysis, reveals that limb loss has happened multiple times within this group. Limb loss has occurred relatively recently, in the past 3.6 million years or so.

== Species ==
The following species are recognized as being valid.

Note: a binomial authority in parentheses indicates that the species was originally described in a genus other than Lerista.

- Lerista aericeps Storr, 1986 – desert plain slider
- Lerista alia Amey, Couper & Worthington-Wilmer, 2019 – Bulleringa fine-lined slider
- Lerista allanae (Longman, 1937) – Allan's lerista, Allan's skink, greater robust fine-lined slider
- Lerista allochira Kendrick, 1989 – Cape Range slider
- Lerista ameles Greer, 1979 – limbless fine-lined slider
- Lerista amicorum L.A. Smith & Adams, 2007 – Fortescue three-toed slider
- Lerista anyara Amey, Couper & Worthington-Wilmer, 2019 – Olkola slider skink
- Lerista apoda Storr, 1976 – Dampier Land limbless slider
- Lerista arenicola Storr, 1971 – bight slider
- Lerista axillaris Storr, 1991 – stripe-sided robust slider
- Lerista baynesi Storr, 1971 – Bayne's slider
- Lerista bipes (Fischer, 1882) – north-western sandslider
- Lerista borealis Storr, 1971 – inland Kimberley slider
- Lerista bougainvillii (Gray, 1839) – Bougainville's skink
- Lerista bunglebungle Storr, 1991 – Bunglebungle robust slider
- Lerista carpentariae Greer, 1983 – Carpentaria fine-lined slider
- Lerista chalybura Storr, 1985 – Pilbara blue-tailed slider
- Lerista chordae Amey, Kutt & Hutchinson, 2005 – lyre-patterned slider
- Lerista christinae Storr, 1979 – bold-striped slider, Christina's lerista
- Lerista cinerea Greer, McDonald & Lawrie, 1983 – vine-thicket fine-lined slider
- Lerista clara L.A. Smith & Adams, 2007 – sharp-blazed three-toed slider
- Lerista colliveri Couper & Ingram, 1992 – nubbinned fine-lined slider
- Lerista connivens Storr, 1971 – blinking broad-blazed slider
- Lerista desertorum (Sternfeld, 1919) – Central Deserts robust slider
- Lerista distinguenda (F. Werner, 1910) – south-western orange-tailed slider
- Lerista dorsalis Storr, 1985 – southern slider
- Lerista edwardsae Storr, 1982 – Myall slider
- Lerista elegans (Gray, 1845) – elegant slider
- Lerista elongata Storr, 1990 – wide-striped mulch slider
- Lerista emmotti Ingram, Couper & Donnellan, 1993 – Noonbah robust slider
- Lerista eupoda L.A. Smith, 1996 – Meekatharra slider
- Lerista flammicauda Storr, 1985 – Pilbara flame-tailed slider
- Lerista fragilis (Günther, 1876) – eastern mulch-slider
- Lerista frosti (F. Zietz, 1920) – centralian slider
- Lerista gascoynensis Storr, 1986 – Gascoyne broad-blazed slider
- Lerista gerrardii (Gray, 1864) – bold-striped robust slider
- Lerista greeri Storr, 1982 – south-eastern Kimberley sandslider
- Lerista griffini Storr, 1982 – stout sandslider
- Lerista haroldi Storr, 1983 – Gnaraloo mulch-slider
- Lerista hobsoni Amey, Couper & Worthington-Wilmer, 2016
- Lerista humphriesi Storr, 1971 – taper-tailed west-coast slider
- Lerista ingrami Storr, 1991 – McIvor River slider
- Lerista ips Storr, 1980 – robust duneslider
- Lerista jacksoni L.A. Smith & Adams, 2007 – Jackson's three-toed slider, Jackson's slider
- Lerista kalumburu Storr, 1976 – Kalumburu slider
- Lerista karlschmidti Marx & Hosmer, 1959 – lesser robust fine-lined slider
- Lerista kendricki Storr, 1991 – dark broad-blazed slider
- Lerista kennedyensis Kendrick, 1989 – Kennedy Range broad-blazed slider
- Lerista kingi L.A. Smith & Adams, 2007 – King's three-toed slider, King's slider
- Lerista labialis Storr, 1971 – southern sandslider
- Lerista lineata Bell, 1833 – Perth slider
- Lerista lineopunctulata A.M.C. Duméril & Bibron, 1839 – dotted-line robust slider, West Coast line-spotted lerista
- Lerista macropisthopus (F. Werner, 1903) – unpatterned robust slider
- Lerista micra L.A. Smith & Adams, 2007 – micro three-toed slider, little slider
- Lerista microtis (Gray, 1845) – south-western slider
- Lerista miopus (Günther, 1867)
- Lerista muelleri (Fischer, 1881) – wood mulch-slider, Mueller's three-toed lerista
- Lerista neander Storr, 1971 – Pilbara robust slider
- Lerista nevinae L.A. Smith & Adams, 2007 – Nevin's three-toed slider, Nevin's slider
- Lerista nichollsi (Loveridge, 1933) – inland broad-blazed slider
- Lerista occulta L.A. Smith & Adams, 2007 – hidden three-toed slider, Carnarvon slider
- Lerista onsloviana Storr, 1984 – Onslow broad-blazed slider
- Lerista orientalis (De Vis, 1889) – north-eastern orange-tailed slider
- Lerista parameles Amey, Couper & Worthington-Wilmer, 2019 – Chillagoe fine-lined slider
- Lerista petersoni Storr, 1976 – pale broad-blazed slider
- Lerista picturata (D. Fry, 1914) – southern robust slider
- Lerista planiventralis (Lucas & C. Frost, 1902) – keeled slider
- Lerista praefrontalis Greer, 1986 – Yampi sandslider
- Lerista praepedita (Boulenger, 1887) – western worm lerista, blunt-tailed west-coast slider
- Lerista punctatovittata (Günther, 1867) – eastern robust slider
- Lerista puncticauda Storr, 1991 – dotty-tailed robust slider
- Lerista quadrivincula Shea, 1991 – four-chained slider
- Lerista robusta Storr, 1990 – brad-eyed sandslider
- Lerista rochfordensis Amey & Couper, 2009 – Rochford slider
- Lerista rolfei L.A. Smith & Adams, 2007 – Rolfe's three-toed slider, Rolfe's slider
- Lerista separanda Storr, 1976 – Dampierland plain slider
- Lerista simillima Storr, 1984 – Fitzroy sandslider
- Lerista speciosa Storr, 1990 – pale-striped mulch-slider
- Lerista stictopleura Storr, 1985 – spotted broad-blazed slider
- Lerista storri Greer, McDonald & Lawrie, 1983 – Mount Surprise slider, Storr's lerista
- Lerista stylis (F. J. Mitchell, 1955) – Arnhem Coast fine-lined slider
- Lerista taeniata Storr, 1986 – ribbon slider, ribbon lerista
- Lerista terdigitata (Parker, 1926) - robust mulch-slider
- Lerista timida (De Vis, 1888) – dwarf three-toed slider, wood mulch-slider
- Lerista tridactyla Storr, 1990 – dark-backed mulch-slider
- Lerista uniduo Storr, 1984 – slender broad-blazed slider
- Lerista vanderduysi Amey, Couper & Worthington-Wilmer, 2016 – leaden-bellied fine-lined slider
- Lerista varia Storr, 1986 – Shark Bay broad-blazed slider
- Lerista verhmens L.A. Smith & Adams, 2007 – powerful three-toed slider
- Lerista vermicularis Storr, 1982 – slender duneslider
- Lerista viduata Storr, 1991 – Ravensthorpe Range slider
- Lerista vittata Greer, McDonald & Lawrie, 1983 – Mount Cooper striped lerista, side-striped fine-lined slider
- Lerista walkeri (Boulenger, 1891) – coastal Kimberley slider
- Lerista wilkinsi (Parker, 1926) – two-toed fine-lined slider
- Lerista xanthura Storr, 1976 – yellow-tailed plain slider
- Lerista yuna Storr, 1991 – Yuna broad-blazed slider
- Lerista zonulata Storr, 1991 – north-eastern orange-tailed slider
