= Lerista wilkinsi =

Conservation status
- Least Concern (IUCN 3.1)

Scientific classification
- Kingdom: Animalia
- Phylum: Chordata
- Class: Reptilia
- Order: Squamata
- Family: Scincidae
- Genus: Lerista
- Species: L. wilkinsi

Binomial name
- Lerista wilkinsi (Parker, 1926)

Synonyms
- Lygosoma wilkinsi Parker, 1926; Rhodona wilkinsi — M.A. Smith, 1937; Lerista wilkinsi — Greer, 1967

Species of lizard

Lerista wilkinsi, also known commonly as the two-toed fine-lined slider and Wilkins' lerista, is a species of skink, a lizard in the family Scincidae. The species is endemic to Queensland in Australia.

== Etymology ==
The specific name, wilkinsi, is in honour of Australian explorer George Hubert Wilkins.

== Habitat ==
The preferred natural habitats of L. wilkinsi are forest and savanna.

== Reproduction ==
Lerista wilkinsi is oviparous.
