= Lerista nevinae =

Conservation status
- Critically Endangered (IUCN 3.1)

Scientific classification
- Kingdom: Animalia
- Phylum: Chordata
- Class: Reptilia
- Order: Squamata
- Family: Scincidae
- Genus: Lerista
- Species: L. nevinae

Binomial name
- Lerista nevinae L.A. Smith & Adams, 2007

Species of lizard

Lerista nevinae, also known commonly as Nevin's three-toed slider and Nevin's slider, is a species of lizard in the subfamily Sphenomorphinae of the family Scincidae (skinks). The species is endemic to the Australian state of Western Australia.

== Etymology ==
The specific name, nevinae, is in honor of Anne F. Nevin of the Western Australian Museum.

== Description ==
Lerista nevinae has 18 scale rows at midbody.

Dorsally, it is pale brown, with black stripes. Ventrally, it is whitish. Adults have a snout-to-vent length (SVL) of about 4 cm (1.6 in).

== Habitat ==
The preferred natural habitat of Lerista nevinae is shrubland on coastal dunes.

== Reproduction ==
Lerista nevinae is oviparous.
