= Lerista christinae =

Conservation status
- Vulnerable (IUCN 3.1)

Scientific classification
- Kingdom: Animalia
- Phylum: Chordata
- Class: Reptilia
- Order: Squamata
- Family: Scincidae
- Genus: Lerista
- Species: L. christinae

Binomial name
- Lerista christinae Storr, 1979

Species of lizard

Lerista christinae, also known commonly as the bold-striped slider and Christina's lerista, is a species of skink, a lizard in the family Scincidae. The species is endemic to the Australian state of Western Australia.

== Etymology ==
The specific name, christinae, is in honor of Australian biologist Christine Davidge.

== Habitat ==
The preferred natural habitat of L. christinae is shrubland.

== Description ==
L. christinae has four digits on each front foot, and four digits on each hind foot.

== Reproduction ==
L. christinae is oviparous.
