= Lerista lineata =

Conservation status
- Endangered (IUCN 3.1)

Scientific classification
- Kingdom: Animalia
- Phylum: Chordata
- Class: Reptilia
- Order: Squamata
- Suborder: Scinciformata
- Infraorder: Scincomorpha
- Family: Sphenomorphidae
- Genus: Lerista
- Species: L. lineata

Binomial name
- Lerista lineata Bell, 1833

Species of lizard

The Perth slider (Lerista lineata) is a species of skink found in Western Australia.
