= Mount Cooper striped lerista =

Conservation status
- Critically Endangered (IUCN 3.1)

Scientific classification
- Kingdom: Animalia
- Phylum: Chordata
- Class: Reptilia
- Order: Squamata
- Family: Scincidae
- Genus: Lerista
- Species: L. vittata

Binomial name
- Lerista vittata Greer, McDonald, & Lawrie, 1983
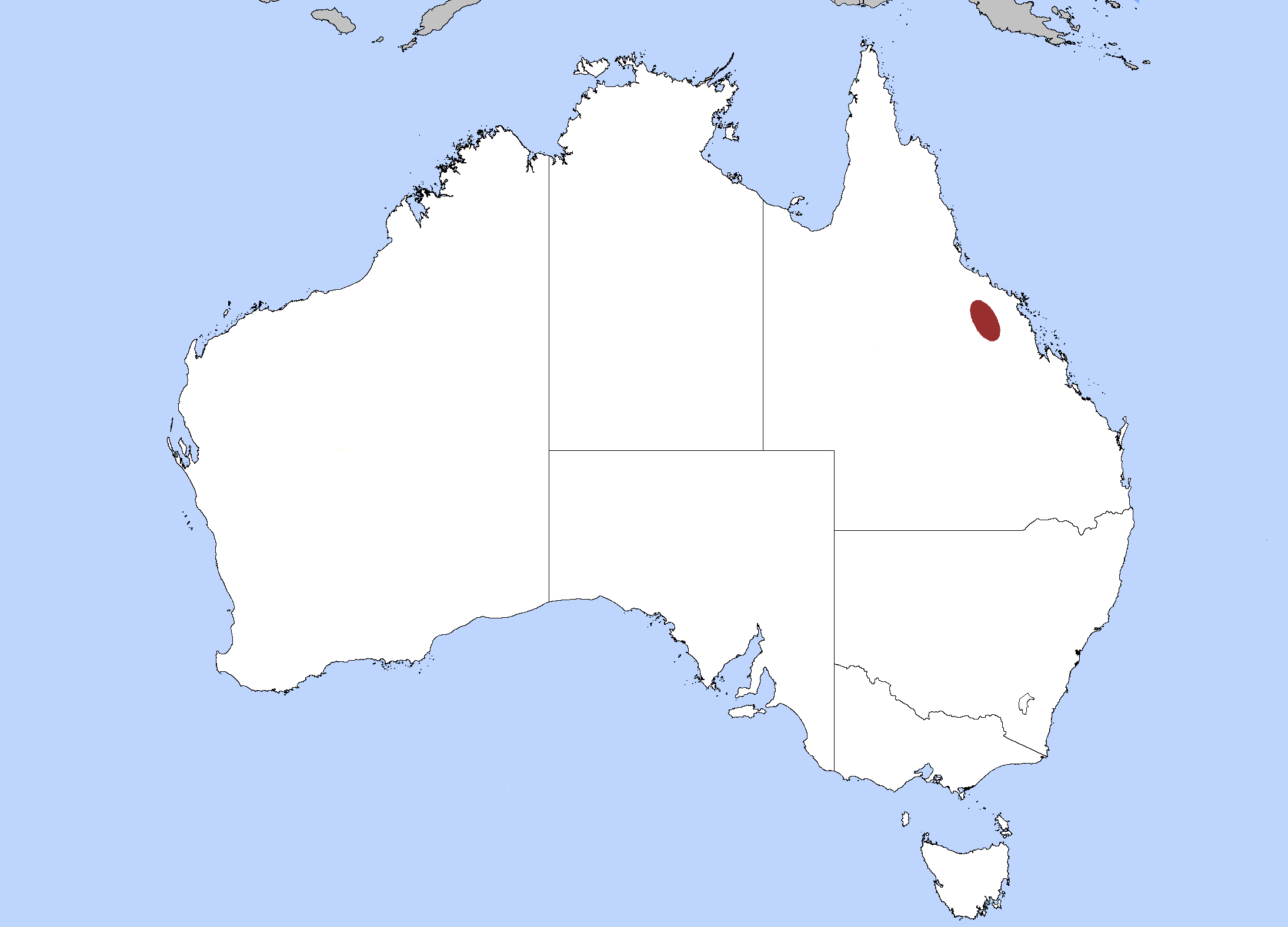
- Distribution of the Mount Cooper Striped Lerista

Species of lizard

The Mount Cooper striped lerista (Lerista vittata), also known as side-striped fine-lined slider or Mount Cooper striped skink, is a species of skink in the family Scincidae. It is found only in Australia.
