= Lerista kennedyensis =

Conservation status
- Least Concern (IUCN 3.1)

Scientific classification
- Kingdom: Animalia
- Phylum: Chordata
- Class: Reptilia
- Order: Squamata
- Family: Scincidae
- Genus: Lerista
- Species: L. kennedyensis

Binomial name
- Lerista kennedyensis Kendrick, 1989
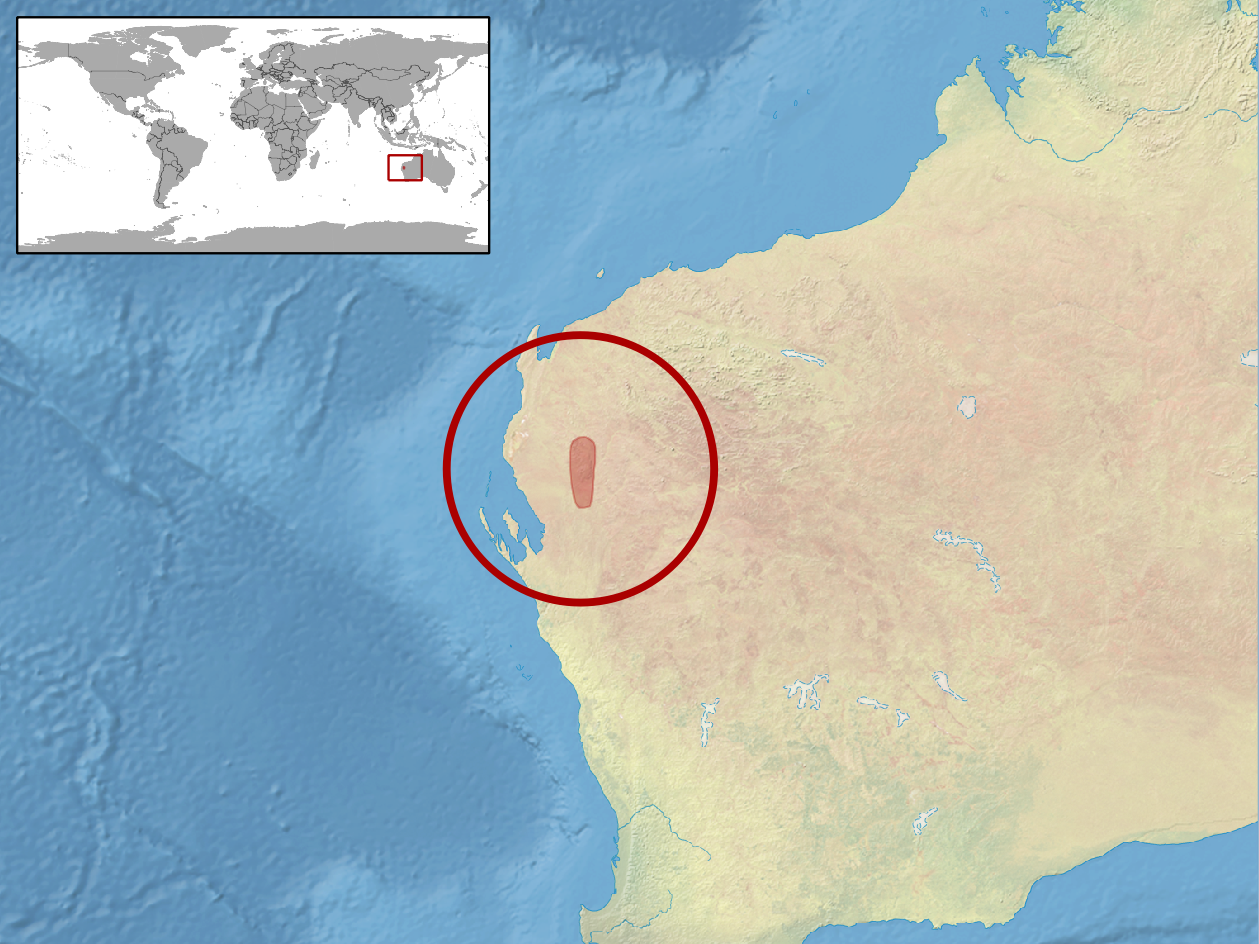

Species of lizard

Lerista kennedyensis, also known commonly as Kennedy's lerista, the Kennedy Range broad-blazed slider, and the Kennedy Range broad-striped slider, is a species of skink, a lizard in the subfamily Sphenomorphinae of the family Scincidae. The species is endemic to the Australian state of Western Australia.

== Etymology ==
The specific name, kennedyensis, refers to the Kennedy Range of mountains.

== Description ==
L. kennedyensis has no front legs, and each small, slender back leg has only two digits.

The flanks are pale orange-brown. The lower eyelid is fused. There is a ventro-lateral keel on each side of the anterior portion of the body. Average snout-to-vent length (SVL) is 5.8 centimetres (2.3 in).

== Habitat ==
The preferred natural habitat of L. kennedyensis is sandy desert and shrubland.

== Reproduction ==
L. kennedyensis is oviparous.
