= Lerista humphriesi =

Conservation status
- Least Concern (IUCN 3.1)

Scientific classification
- Kingdom: Animalia
- Phylum: Chordata
- Class: Reptilia
- Order: Squamata
- Family: Scincidae
- Genus: Lerista
- Species: L. humphriesi

Binomial name
- Lerista humphriesi Storr, 1971

Species of lizard

Lerista humphriesi, also known commonly as Humphries' lerista and the taper-tailed west-coast slider, is a species of skink, a lizard in the family Scincidae. The species is endemic to the Australian state of Western Australia.

== Etymology ==
The specific name, humphriesi, is in honor of Australian ecologist Robert B. Humphries.

== Habitat ==
The preferred natural habitats of L. humphriesi are grassland and shrubland.

== Description ==
L. humphriesi is completely limbless.
