= Lerista rochfordensis =

Conservation status
- Vulnerable (IUCN 3.1)

Scientific classification
- Kingdom: Animalia
- Phylum: Chordata
- Class: Reptilia
- Order: Squamata
- Suborder: Scinciformata
- Infraorder: Scincomorpha
- Family: Sphenomorphidae
- Genus: Lerista
- Species: L. rochfordensis

Binomial name
- Lerista rochfordensis Amey & Couper, 2009

Species of lizard

The Rochford slider (Lerista rochfordensis) is a species of skink found in Queensland in Australia.
