= Lerista emmotti =

Conservation status
- Least Concern (IUCN 3.1)

Scientific classification
- Kingdom: Animalia
- Phylum: Chordata
- Class: Reptilia
- Order: Squamata
- Family: Scincidae
- Genus: Lerista
- Species: L. emmotti

Binomial name
- Lerista emmotti Ingram, Couper & Donnellan, 1993

Species of lizard

Lerista emmotti, also known commonly as the Noonbah robust slider, is a species of skink, a lizard in the family Scincidae. The species is endemic to Queensland in Australia.

== Etymology ==
The specific name, emmotti, is in honor of Angus Emmott (born 1962), who is an Australian sheep farmer and naturalist.

== Geographic range ==
Native to central Queensland, the type locality of L. emmotti is Noonbah Station, 140 km south of Longreach.

== Habitat ==
The preferred natural habitats of L. emmotti are savanna and shrubland.

== Description ==
L. emmotti has two digits on each of its four feet.

== Behavior ==
L. emmotti is terrestrial and fossorial.

== Reproduction ==
L. emmotti is oviparous.
