= Lerista chalybura =

Scientific classification
- Domain: Eukaryota
- Kingdom: Animalia
- Phylum: Chordata
- Class: Reptilia
- Order: Squamata
- Family: Scincidae
- Genus: Lerista
- Species: L. chalybura

Binomial name
- Lerista chalybura Storr, 1985

Species of lizard

Lerista chalybura, the Pilbara blue-tailed slider, is a species of skink found in Western Australia.
