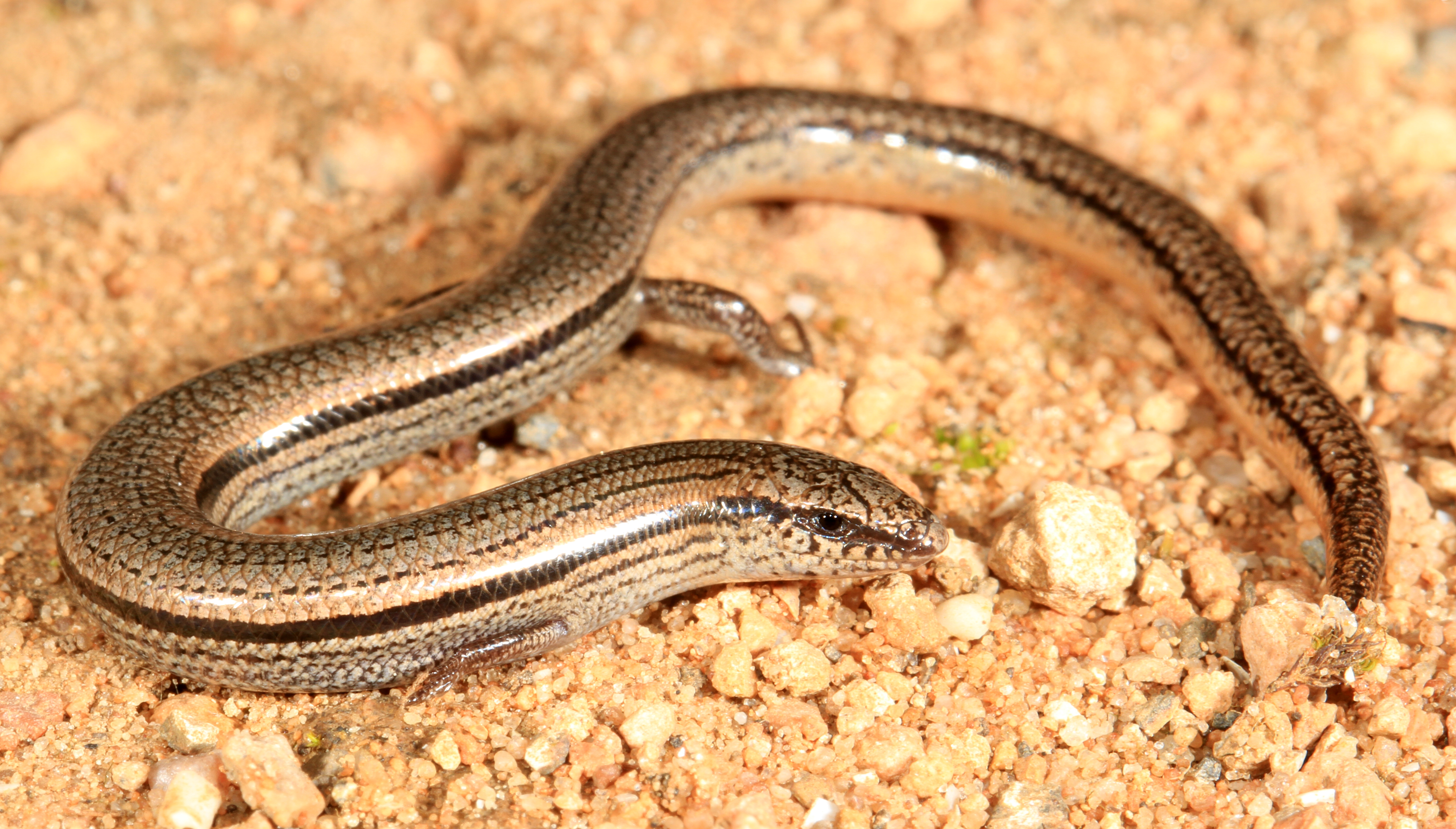

Conservation status
- Least Concern (IUCN 3.1)

Scientific classification
- Kingdom: Animalia
- Phylum: Chordata
- Class: Reptilia
- Order: Squamata
- Suborder: Scinciformata
- Infraorder: Scincomorpha
- Family: Sphenomorphidae
- Genus: Lerista
- Species: L. dorsalis

Binomial name
- Lerista dorsalis Storr, 1985

= Lerista dorsalis =

Species of lizard

The southern slider (Lerista dorsalis) is a species of skink found in South Australia and Western Australia.
