= Lerista ingrami =

Conservation status
- Data Deficient (IUCN 3.1)

Scientific classification
- Kingdom: Animalia
- Phylum: Chordata
- Class: Reptilia
- Order: Squamata
- Family: Scincidae
- Genus: Lerista
- Species: L. ingrami

Binomial name
- Lerista ingrami Storr, 1991

Species of lizard

Lerista ingrami, also known commonly as the McIvor River slider, is a species of skink, a lizard in the family Scincidae. The species is endemic to Queensland in Australia.

== Etymology ==
The specific name, ingrami, is in honor of Australian herpetologist Glen Joseph Ingram.

== Habitat ==
The preferred natural habitat of L. ingrami is coastal sand dunes.

== Description ==
For its genus, L. ingrami is slender, very pale, and very small. Its average snout-to-vent length (SVL) is 25 mm (0.98 in). It has four digits on each of its four feet. The eyelid is immovable, with a transparent "spectacle".

== Behavior ==
L. ingrami is terrestrial and fossorial.

== Reproduction ==
L. ingrami is oviparous.
