= Lerista bipes =

Conservation status
- Least Concern (IUCN 3.1)

Scientific classification
- Kingdom: Animalia
- Phylum: Chordata
- Class: Reptilia
- Order: Squamata
- Suborder: Scinciformata
- Infraorder: Scincomorpha
- Family: Sphenomorphidae
- Genus: Lerista
- Species: L. bipes

Binomial name
- Lerista bipes (Fischer, 1882)

Species of lizard

The north-western sandslider (Lerista bipes) is a species of skink found in Western Australia, Northern Territory, Queensland and South Australia.
