= Lerista taeniata =

Conservation status
- Least Concern (IUCN 3.1)

Scientific classification
- Kingdom: Animalia
- Phylum: Chordata
- Class: Reptilia
- Order: Squamata
- Suborder: Scinciformata
- Infraorder: Scincomorpha
- Family: Sphenomorphidae
- Genus: Lerista
- Species: L. taeniata

Binomial name
- Lerista taeniata Storr, 1986
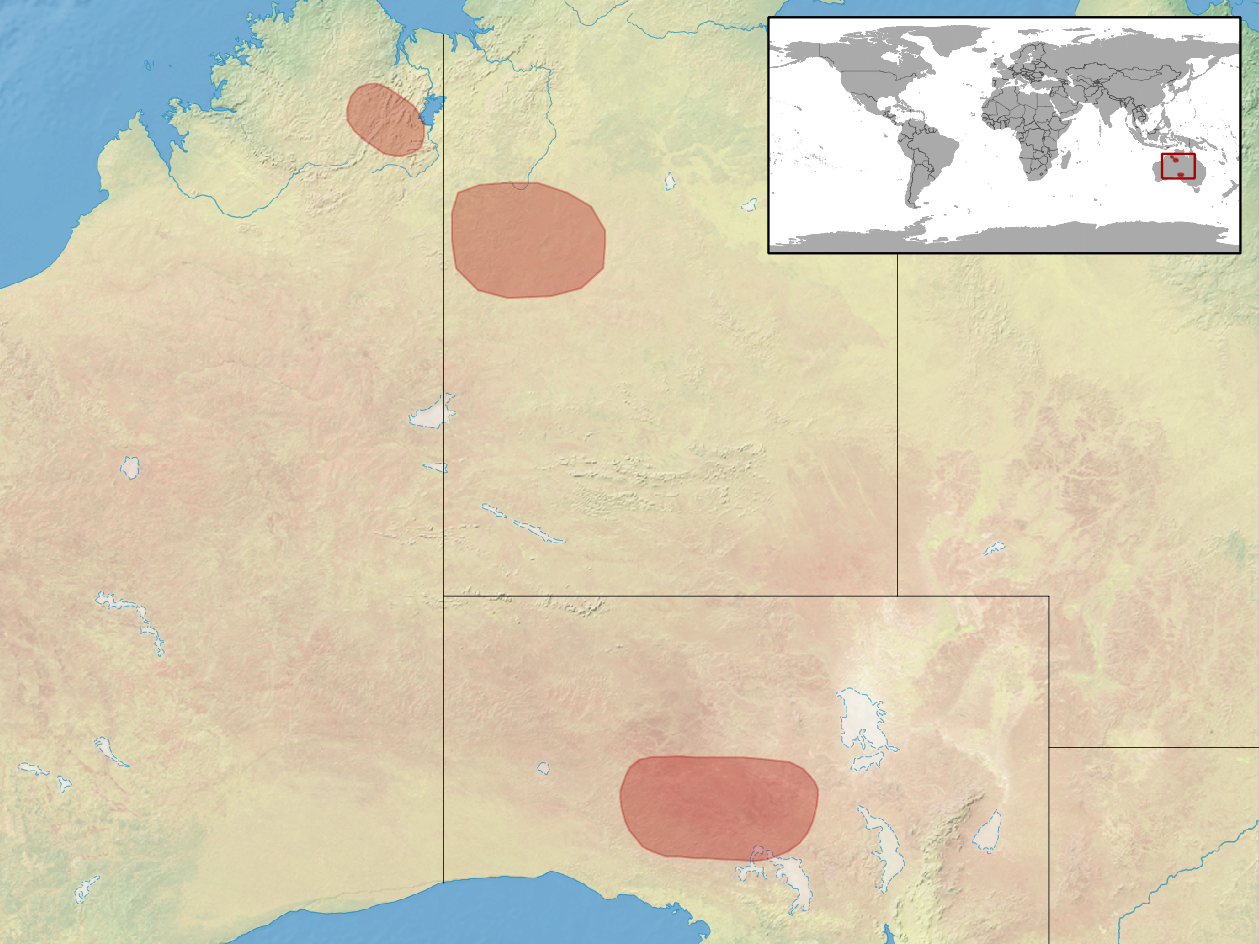

Species of lizard

The ribbon slider or ribbon lerista (Lerista taeniata) is a species of skink found in Northern Territory and Western Australia.
