= Lerista aericeps =

Conservation status
- Least Concern (IUCN 3.1)

Scientific classification
- Kingdom: Animalia
- Phylum: Chordata
- Class: Reptilia
- Order: Squamata
- Suborder: Scinciformata
- Infraorder: Scincomorpha
- Family: Sphenomorphidae
- Genus: Lerista
- Species: L. aericeps

Binomial name
- Lerista aericeps Storr, 1986

Species of lizard

The desert plain slider (Lerista aericeps) is a species of skink found in Northern Territory, Queensland, and New South Wales in Australia.
