= Wood mulch-slider =

Conservation status
- Least Concern (IUCN 3.1)

Scientific classification
- Kingdom: Animalia
- Phylum: Chordata
- Class: Reptilia
- Order: Squamata
- Family: Scincidae
- Genus: Lerista
- Species: L. muelleri

Binomial name
- Lerista muelleri (Fischer, 1881)

Synonyms
- Phaneropis muelleri Fischer, 1881; Ablepharus muelleri — Montague, 1914; Lerista muelleri — Greer, 1967; Miculia muelleri — Wells & Wellington, 1985; Lerista muelleri — Cogger, 2000; Phaneropis muelleri — Wells, 2012

Species of lizard

The wood mulch-slider (Lerista muelleri), also known commonly as Mueller's three-toed lerista and Mueller's three-toed slider, is a species of lizard belonging to the subfamily Sphenomorphinae of the extensive family Scincidae, a family containing over 1,500 species. The species is found in a diverse range of climates and habitats throughout Western Australia, Northern Territory, Queensland, New South Wales, South Australia and Victoria. Named after the German-born Australian naturalist Baron Ferdinand Jacob Heinrich Müller (1825–1896), the species has been the subject of much morphological and nomenclatural debate.

== Description ==
Lerista muelleri is a small terrestrial lizard typically reaching a maximum snout-to-vent length (SVL) of 50 mm (2.0 in), and reaching an adult total length (tail included) of up to 103 mm (4.1 in). A key distinguishing feature of the species is the presence of three digits on each of the forelimbs and hindlimbs. Scales are small, shiny, smooth-textured and illustrate a tight pattern of composition. The head is elongated, displaying a brown to black flecked pattern with recessed ears, and a pointed snout providing evidence of adaptive fossorial behaviour.

Colouration is reflective of habitat, with the body commonly exhibiting brown, grey and bronze tones. In the western parts of the continent, lateral striping is often indeterminate. However, individuals in the east often present with clearly defined black longitudinal striping. The underside often demonstrates lighter colouration, incorporating a blotched pattern of brown spots. Juveniles are often identified by the presence of a reddish colour at the tail.

== Taxonomy ==
Named after the German-born Australian naturalist Ferdinand von Mueller, Lerista muelleri belong to the genus Lerista consisting of in excess of 80 species. The species has undergone extensive morphological investigation resulting in the renaming of what had been acknowledged as taxonomic uncertainty in a widespread and highly diverse species group. A revision in 2007 broadly surveyed specimens from Western Australian collections and identified thirteen species in populations that had been assigned to this name, several previous descriptions and nine new species, and redefined this species with a revised description.

== Distribution ==
Lerista muelleri is distributed throughout the Australian mainland ranging from the Northern Territory, Western Australia, Queensland, South Australia, NSW and Victoria. There are no records of the species being found in the state of Tasmania. Individuals are likely to be found in a variety of climatic and terrestrial conditions ranging from hot dry sandy deserts, to more temperate vegetated climates associated with the higher latitudes of the southern states of the continent.

== Habitat and ecology ==
Lerista muelleri is a fossorial diurnal species that occupy their time foraging for food during daylight hours. Similar to many other reptiles, they are ectothermic relying upon environmental conditions for body temperature regulation. Typically, individuals will begin the day in search of the sun to raise body temperatures to gain energy for foraging, and to aid with digestion. Like most ectotherms, when energy levels are adequate, individuals will often seek shelter beneath sand, or in the form of loose soil, fallen logs, and the cover of ground litter and debris.

Habitats are varied and are ultimately reflective of direct environmental conditions. In hot arid regions of the continent, individuals may be found burrowed into sand, or under the cover of rocky outcrops. In more temperate regions of the continent, species are likely to be found in a variety of habitats from floodplains, grassy box woodlands, black box woodlands, and mallee woodlands.

== Reproduction ==
Lerista muelleri is classified as an oviparous reptile producing on average two eggs per clutch. Reproduction is predominantly determined by a combination of both seasonal and environmental factors. As with most oviparous reptiles, females select for sites offering the greatest protection from predation. In the more arid parts of the continent, eggs are likely to be deposited under the protection of sand, providing potential offspring with the benefits of security and ideal climatic conditions for incubation. Similar to their desert dwelling counterparts, individuals residing in more temperate climatic conditions, preferred environments are those likely to increase rates of incubation. This may include protection from predation, cold and wet conditions, under the cover of fallen debris, loose soil, fallen logs, leaf litter and rocks. Rates of mortality amongst juveniles is high as a direct result of stochastic environmental factors.

== Diet ==
The diet of Lerista muelleri is variable consisting of a combination of phyla ranging from invertebrate insects to subterranean species of nematodes. Evidence suggests there are key differences in dietary requirements between the sexes. Due to the size differences, females are likely to select in favour of larger surface dwelling invertebrates, as opposed to males who spend most of their time foraging for smaller more elusive prey. Quite often, individuals will use a combination of olfactory and visual senses to locate prey depending on their environments.

== Predators ==
As with many other small species of ground dwelling animal, predation on L. muelleri comes in many forms. Individuals are often the subject of aerial attack by birds, whilst on the ground, exposure can often lead to individuals being at risk of predation by numerous species of both indigenous and exotic mammal species. Other threats may come in the form of numerous species of elapids, arachnoid and parasitic predators in the form of ticks and mites. Similar to many other species of Scincidae, individuals have the inherent morphological trait of caudal autotomy allowing them to drop or lose part of their tails in the event of capture.

== Threats ==
As with many other species of animal on the Australian continent, impacts of land clearing, altered fire regimes, and agricultural endeavours result in loss of habitat for L. muelleri. However, records of sightings indicate there are no imminent conservational threats.
