= Lerista zonulata =

Conservation status
- Least Concern (IUCN 3.1)

Scientific classification
- Kingdom: Animalia
- Phylum: Chordata
- Class: Reptilia
- Order: Squamata
- Suborder: Scinciformata
- Infraorder: Scincomorpha
- Family: Sphenomorphidae
- Genus: Lerista
- Species: L. zonulata

Binomial name
- Lerista zonulata Storr, 1991

Species of lizard

The north-eastern orange-tailed slider (Lerista zonulata) is a species of skink found in Queensland in Australia.
