= Frontoparietal scale =

In reptiles, the frontoparietal scales are scales located behind the eyes, between the frontal scales to the front and the parietal scales to the back.
