= Supraciliary scale =

Scales

In reptiles, the supraciliary scales are scales located immediately above the eyes, below the supraocular scales.
