= Jessica Worthington Wilmer =

Australian evolutionary biologist

- Education: University of Queensland
- Scientific career
- Workplaces: University of Cambridge; Boston University; Queensland Museum
- Thesis: Genetic variation and population structure in the threatened ghost bat, Macroderma gigas (1997)

Jessica Worthington Wilmer is an Australian evolutionary biologist who has worked at the Queensland Museum since 2002.

== Education ==
Wilmer completed her secondary education at St Margaret's Anglican Girls' School in 1985. She graduated from the University of Queensland (UQ) with a BSc (hons) in 1990. She researched and wrote her PhD at UQ from 1992 to 1996. Her thesis was "Genetic variation and population structure in the threatened ghost bat, Macroderma gigas".

== Career ==
Wilmer moved to Melbourne in 1991 to work at La Trobe University before returning to UQ to research her PhD. To broaden her develop her skills she moved to the University of Cambridge from 1996 to 1999, where she won a fellowship from the American Association of University Women to study at Boston University.

Wilmer returned to Australia to join the Queensland Museum in 2002. She manages the Molecular Identities Lab, where she has contributed to the description or redefinition of nearly 30 species and genera.

== See also ==
- Category:Taxa named by Jessica Worthington Wilmer
