= List of reptiles of Western Australia =

This is a list of reptiles of Western Australia:

== Crocodylia (crocodiles) ==
Crocodylidae

- Crocodylus johnstoni (freshwater crocodile)
- Crocodylus porosus (estuarine crocodile, saltwater crocodile)

== Testudines (turtles) ==
Chelidae

- Chelodina colliei (southwestern snake-necked turtle, oblong turtle)
- Chelodina oblonga (northern snake-necked turtle)
- Chelodina steindachneri (dinner-plate turtle, flat-shelled turtle)
- Chelodina burrungandjii
- Chelodina kuchlingi
- Chelodina walloyarrina
- Elseya dentata (northern snapping turtle)
- Emydura victoriae (red-faced turtle)
- Pseudemydura umbrina (western swamp turtle)

Cheloniidae

- Caretta caretta (loggerhead sea turtle)
- Chelonia mydas (green sea turtle)
- Eretmochelys imbricata (hawksbill sea turtle)
- Lepidochelys olivacea (olive ridley sea turtle, Pacific ridley sea turtle)
- Natator depressus (flatback sea turtle)

Dermochelyidae

- Dermochelys coriacea (leatherback turtle, leathery turtle, lute turtle)

== Squamata (lizards) ==
Agamidae (dragons)

- Amphibolurus norrisi
- Caimanops amphiboluroides (mulga dragon)
- Chelosania brunnea (chameleon dragon)
- Chlamydosaurus kingii (frill-necked lizard, frilled lizard)
- Cryptagama aurita
- Ctenophorus caudicinctus (ring-tailed dragon)
- Ctenophorus clayi
- Ctenophorus cristatus (crested dragon)
- Ctenophorus femoralis
- Ctenophorus fordi (Malle dragon)
- Ctenophorus isolepis (military dragon)
- Ctenophorus maculatus (spotted dragon)
- Ctenophorus mckenziei
- Ctenophorus nuchalis (central netted dragon)
- Ctenophorus ornatus (ornate crevice-dragon)
- Ctenophorus pictus (painted dragon)
- Ctenophorus reticulatus (western netted dragon)
- Ctenophorus rufescens
- Ctenophorus salinarum
- Ctenophorus scutulatus (lozenge-marked dragon)
- Ctenophorus yinnietharra (Yinnietharra dragon)
- Diporiphora albilabris
- Diporiphora bennettii
- Diporiphora bilineata (two-lined dragon)
- Diporiphora convergens
- Diporiphora lalliae
- Diporiphora magna
- Diporiphora pindan
- Diporiphora reginae
- Diporiphora superba
- Diporiphora valens
- Diporiphora winneckei
- Lophognathus gilberti (Gilbert's dragon)
- Lophognathus longirostris (long-nosed water dragon)
- Lophognathus temporalis (northern water dragon)
- Moloch horridus (thorny dragon or thorny devil)
- Pogona microlepidota
- Pogona minor (bearded dragon)
  - P. m. minor (western bearded dragon)
  - P. m. minima (Abrolhos bearded dragon)
  - P. m. mitchelli
- Pogona nullarbor
- Genus Tympanocryptis
  - T. adelaidensis (Queen Adelaide dragon)
  - T. cephalus (blotch-tailed earless dragon)
  - T. intima (gibber earless dragon)
  - T. lineata (lineated earless dragon)
  - T. parviceps (Gnaraloo heath dragon)
  - T. uniformis (even-scaled earless dragon)

Gekkonidae (geckoes)

- Amalosia obscura
- Christinus alexanderi (marbled gecko)
- Christinus marmoratus (marbled gecko)
- Crenadactylus ocellatus (clawless gecko)
- Diplodactylus alboguttatus
- Diplodactylus assimilis
- Diplodactylus ciliaris (spiny-tailed gecko)
- Diplodactylus conspicillatus (fat-tailed gecko)
- Diplodactylus elderi (jewelled gecko)
- Diplodactylus fulleri
- Diplodactylus galeatus
- Diplodactylus granariensis
- Diplodactylus intermedius (eastern spiny-tailed gecko)
- Diplodactylus jeanae
- Diplodactylus kenneallyi
- Diplodactylus maini
- Diplodactylus mcmillani
- Diplodactylus michaelseni
- Diplodactylus mitchelli
- Diplodactylus occultus
- Diplodactylus ornatus
- Diplodactylus polyophthalmus
- Diplodactylus pulcher
- Diplodactylus rankini
- Diplodactylus savagei
- Diplodactylus squarrosus
- Diplodactylus stenodactylus (crowned gecko)
- Diplodactylus strophurus
- Diplodactylus taeniatus (white-striped gecko)
- Diplodactylus wellingtonae
- Diplodactylus wilsoni
- Diplodactylus wombeyi
- Gehyra australis (northern dtella, house gecko)
- Gehyra fenestrula (Pilbara spotted gecko)
- Gehyra montium
- Gehyra nana
- Gehyra occidentalis
- Gehyra pilbara (Pilbara dtella)
- Gehyra punctata (spotted gecko)
- Gehyra purpurascens
- Gehyra variegata (tree dtella)
- Gehyra xenopus
- Hemidactylus frenatus (Asian house gecko)

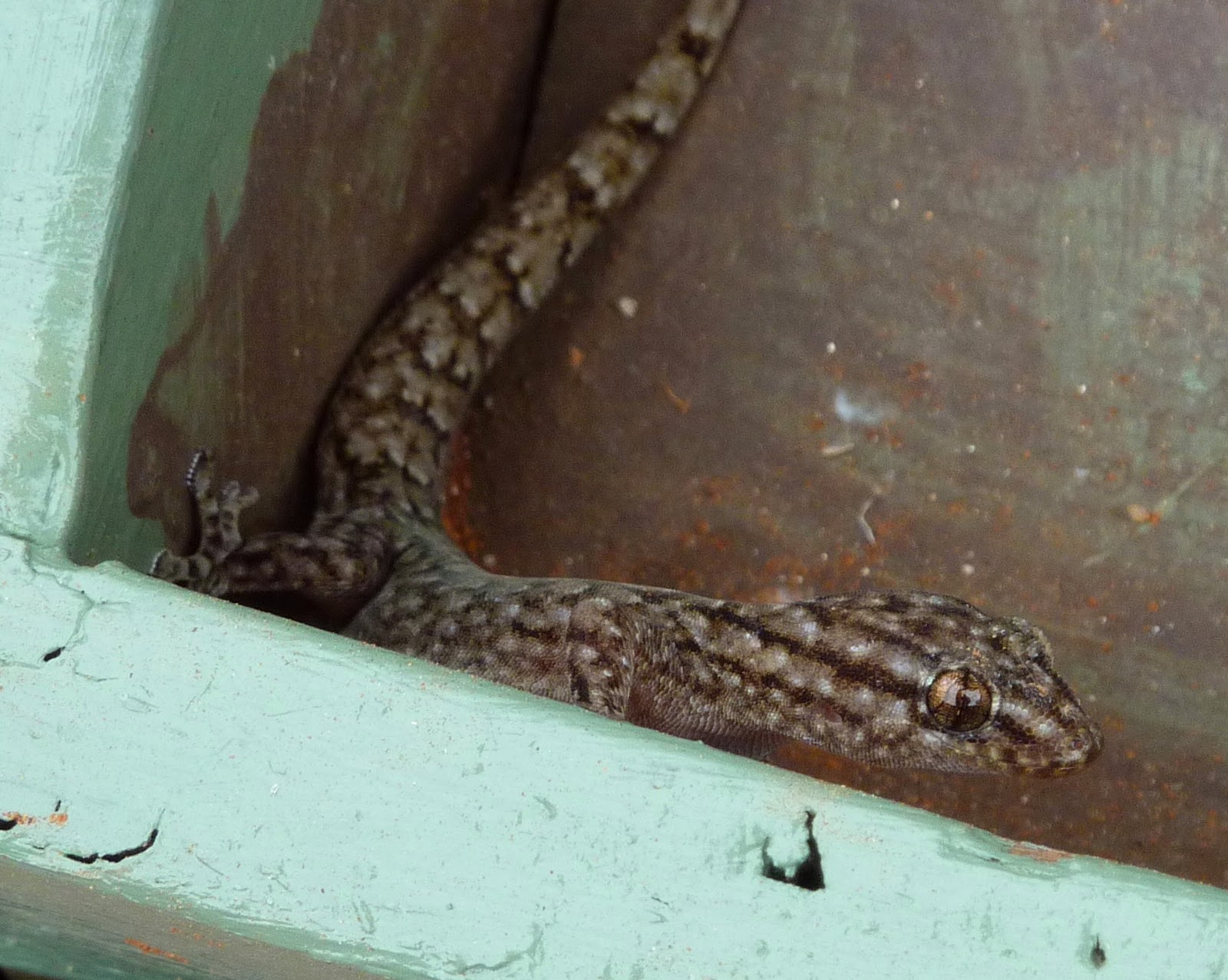
Bynoe's gecko (Heteronotia binoei), Northern Territory, Australia

- Heteronotia binoei (Bynoe's gecko, prickly gecko)
- Heteronotia planiceps
- Heteronotia spelea (desert cave gecko)
- Lucasium damaeum (beaded gecko)
- Nephrurus asper (spiny knob-tailed gecko)
- Nephrurus laevissimus (knob-tailed gecko)
- Nephrurus levis (knob-tailed gecko)
- Nephrurus stellatus (southern knob-tailed gecko)
- Nephrurus vertebralis (knob-tailed gecko)
- Nephrurus wheeleri (knob-tailed gecko)
- Oedura filicipoda
- Oedura gracilis
- Oedura marmorata (marbled velvet gecko)
- Oedura reticulata (reticulated velvet gecko)
- Oedura rhombifer (zigzag gecko)
- Pseudothecadactylus lindneri (giant cave gecko)
- Rhynchoedura ornata (western beaked gecko)
- Strophurus assimilis (Goldfields spiny-tailed gecko)
- Strophurus spinula (lesser thorn-tailed gecko)
- Underwoodisaurus milii (thick-tailed gecko)

Pygopodidae (legless lizards)

- Aprasia haroldi
- Aprasia inaurita
- Aprasia pulchella
- Aprasia repens
- Aprasia rostrata
- Aprasia smithi
- Aprasia striolata
- Delma borea
- Delma concinna
- Delma elegans
- Delma fraseri
- Delma grayii
- Delma haroldi
- Delma nasuta
- Delma pax
- Delma tincta
- Lialis burtonis (Burton's legless lizard)
- Pletholax gracilis
- Pygopus lepidopodus (common scaly foot)
- Pygopus nigriceps (black-headed scaly foot)
- Pygopus steelescotti

Scincidae (skinks)

- Bassiana trilineata
- Carlia amax
- Carlia gracilis
- Carlia johnstonei
- Carlia munda
- Carlia rufilatus
- Carlia triacantha
- Cryptoblepharus carnabyi
- Cryptoblepharus megastic
- Cryptoblepharus plagiocephalus
- Cryptoblepharus virgatus
- Ctenotus alacer
- Ctenotus alleni
- Ctenotus angusticeps
- Ctenotus ariadnae
- Ctenotus atlas
- Ctenotus australis
- Ctenotus brooksi
- Ctenotus calurus
- Ctenotus catenifer
- Ctenotus colletti
- Ctenotus decaneurus
- Ctenotus delli
- Ctenotus dux
- Ctenotus ehmanni
- Ctenotus fallens
- Ctenotus gemmula
- Ctenotus grandis
- Ctenotus greeri
- Ctenotus hanloni
- Ctenotus helenae
- Ctenotus impar
- Ctenotus inornatus
- Ctenotus labillardieri
- Ctenotus lancelini
- Ctenotus leae
- Ctenotus leonhardii
- Ctenotus mastigura
- Ctenotus militaris
- Ctenotus mimetes
- Ctenotus nasutus
- Ctenotus ora
- Ctenotus nigrilineatus
- Ctenotus pantherinus
- Ctenotus piankai
- Ctenotus quattuordecimli
- Ctenotus robustus
- Ctenotus rubicundus
- Ctenotus rufescens
- Ctenotus rutilans
- Ctenotus saxatilis
- Ctenotus schomburgkii
- Ctenotus serventyi
- Ctenotus severus
- Ctenotus tanamiensis
- Ctenotus tantillus
- Ctenotus uber
- Ctenotus xenopleura
- Ctenotus youngsoni
- Ctenotus zastictus
- Cyclodomorphus branchial
- Cyclodomorphus maxima
- Egernia carinata
- Egernia adepressa
- Egernia douglasi
- Egernia formosa
- Egernia inornata
- Egernia kingii
- Egernia kintorei
- Egernia luctuosa
- Egernia multiscutata
- Egernia napoleonis
- Egernia pilbarensis
- Egernia pulchra
- Egernia stokesii
- Egernia striata
- Eremiascincus richardson (broad-banded sand swimmer)
- Glaphyromorphus brongers
- Glaphyromorphus darwinie
- Glaphyromorphus gracilip
- Glaphyromorphus isolepis
- Hemiergis initialis
- Hemiergis millewae
- Hemiergis peronii
- Hemiergis quadrilineatum
- Lerista allochira
- Lerista apoda
- Lerista arenicola
- Lerista axillaris
- Lerista bipes
- Lerista borealis
- Lerista bunglebungle
- Lerista chalybura
- Lerista christinae
- Lerista concolor
- Lerista connivens
- Lerista distinguenda
- Lerista dorsalis
- Lerista elegans
- Lerista flammicauda
- Lerista frosti
- Lerista gascoynensis
- Lerista gerrardii
- Lerista greeri
- Lerista griffini
- Lerista haroldi
- Lerista humphriesi
- Lerista ips
- Lerista kalumburu
- Lerista kendricki
- Lerista kennedyensis
- Lerista labialis
- Lerista lineata
- Lerista lineopunctulata
- Lerista macropisthopus
- Lerista maculosa
- Lerista microtis
- Lerista muelleri
- Lerista neander
- Lerista nichollsi
- Lerista onsloviana
- Lerista petersoni
- Lerista picturata
- Lerista planiventralis
- Lerista praefrontalis
- Lerista praepedita
- Lerista puncticauda
- Lerista quadrilineata
- Lerista robusta
- Lerista separanda
- Lerista simillima
- Lerista stictopleura
- Lerista taeniata
- Lerista talpina
- Lerista terdigitata
- Lerista tridactyla
- Lerista uniduo
- Lerista varia
- Lerista vermicularis
- Lerista viduata
- Lerista walkeri
- Lerista xanthura
- Lerista yuna
- Menetia amaura
- Menetia greyii
- Menetia maini
- Menetia surda
- Morethia adelaidensis
- Morethia boulengeri
- Morethia butleri
- Morethia lineoocellata
- Morethia obscura
- Morethia ruficauda
- Morethia storri
- Notoscincus butleri
- Notoscincus ornatus
- Proablepharus reginae
- Proablepharus tenuis
- Pseudemoia baudini
- Tiliqua multifasciata (Centralian blue-tongued lizard)
- Tiliqua occipitalis (western blue-tongued lizard)
- Tiliqua scincoides (eastern blue-tongued lizard)
- Trachydosaurus rugosus (shingle-back)

Varanidae (goannas or monitors)

- Varanus acanthurus (ridge-tailed monitor)
- Varanus brevicauda (short-tailed pygmy monitor)
- Varanus caudolineatus (line-tailed pygmy monitor)
- Varanus eremius (rusty desert monitor)
- Varanus giganteus (perentie)
- Varanus gilleni (pygmy mulga monitor)
- Varanus glauerti (Glauert's monitor)
- Varanus glebopalma (long-tailed rock monitor)
- Varanus gouldii (Gould's goanna, sand monitor)
- Varanus gouldii flavirufus (Centralian sand goanna)
- Varanus kingorum (pygmy rock monitor)
- Varanus mertensi (Mertens' water monitor)
- Varanus mitchelli (Mitchell's water monitor)
- Varanus panoptes (yellow-spotted monitor)
- Varanus pilbarensis (Pilbara rock monitor)
- Varanus rosenbergi (Rosenberg's heath monitor)
- Varanus storri (Storr's monitor)
- Varanus timorensis (Timor monitor, spotted tree monitor)
- Varanus tristis (black-headed monitor, freckled monitor)

== Serpentes (snakes) ==
Acrochordidae (file snakes)

- Acrochordus granulatus (little file snake)

Pythonidae (pythons)

- Antaresia childreni (Children's python)
- Antaresia maculosa (spotted python)
- Antaresia perthensis (pygmy python)
- Antaresia stimsoni (large-blotched python)
- Aspidites melanocephalus (black-headed python)
- Aspidites ramsayi (woma python)
- Liasis fuscus (water python)
- Liasis olivaceus (olive python)
  - L. o. barroni (western olive python)
- Morelia carinata (rough-scaled python)
- Morelia spilota (carpet python)
- M. s. imbricata (southwestern carpet python)
- M. s. variegata (northwestern carpet python)

Colubridae (Colubrids)

- Boiga irregularis (brown tree snake)
- Cerberus rhynchops (bockadam)
- Dendrelaphis punctulata (common tree snake)
- Fordonia leucobalia (white-bellied mangrove snake)
- Myron richardsonii (Richardson's mangrove snake)
- Tropidonophis mairii (keelback or freshwater snake)

Elapidae (Elapids)

- Acanthophis antarcticus (common death adder)
- Acanthophis praelongus (northern death adder)
- Acanthophis pyrrhus (desert death adder)
- Demansia atra (black whip snake)
- Demansia olivacea (marble-headed whip snake)
- Demansia papuensis (Papaun whip snake)
- Demansia psammophis (yellow-faced whip snake)
- Demansia simplex (whip snake)
- Drysdalia coronata (crowned snake)
- Drysdalia mastersii (Masters' snake)
- Echiopsis atriceps
- Echiopsis curta (bardick)
- Elapognathus minor (little brown snake)
- Furina ornata (orange-naped snake)
- Notechis scutatus (eastern tiger snake, mainland tiger snake)
- Oxyuranus scutellatus (coastal taipan)
- Oxyuranus temporalis (Central Ranges taipan)
- Pseudechis australis (king brown, mulga snake)
- Pseudechis butleri (Butler's snake)
- Pseudonaja affinis (dugite)
- Pseudonaja inframacula (peninsula brown snake)
- Pseudonaja ingrami (Ingram's brown snake)
- Pseudonaja modesta (ringed brown snake)
- Pseudonaja nuchalis (western brown snake, gwarder)
- Pseudonaja textilis (common brown snake, eastern brown snake)
- Rhinoplocephalus bicolor (Muller's snake)
- Rhinoplocephalus pallidiceps (northern small-eyed snake)
- Simoselaps anomalus (northern desert banded snake)
- Simoselaps approximans
- Simoselaps bertholdi (desert banded snake)
- Simoselaps bimaculatus (western black-naped snake)
- Simoselaps calonotus (western black-striped snake)
- Simoselaps fasciolatus (narrow-banded burrowing snake)
- Simoselaps littoralis (coastal burrowing snake)
- Simoselaps minimus
- Simoselaps semifasciatus (half-girdled snake)
- Suta fasciata (Rosen's snake)
- Suta gouldii (black-headed snake)
- Suta monachus (hooded snake)
- Suta nigriceps
- Suta ordensis (Ord curl snake)
- Suta punctata (little spotted snake)
- Suta spectabilis
- Suta suta (myall snake, curl snake)
- Vermicella annulata (bandy-bandy)
- Vermicella multifasciata (northern bandy-bandy)

Hydrophiidae (sea snakes)

- Acalyptophis peronii
- Aipysurus apraefrontalis
- Aipysurus duboisii (Dubois's sea snake)
- Aipysurus eydouxii (spine-tailed sea snake)
- Aipysurus foliosquama
- Aipysurus fuscus
- Aipysurus laevis (olive sea snake)
- Aipysurus tenuis
- Astrotia stokesii
- Disteira kingii
- Disteira major
- Disteira stokesii
- Emydocephalus annulatus
- Ephalophis greyi
- Hydrelaps darwiniensis
- Hydrophis atriceps
- Hydrophis coggeri
- Hydrophis czeblukovi
- Hydrophis elegans
- Hydrophis geometricus
- Hydrophis inornatus
- Hydrophis mcdowelli
- Hydrophis melanocephalus
- Hydrophis melanosoma
- Hydrophis ornatus
- Lapemis hardwickii
- Parahydrophis mertoni
- Pelamis platurus (yellow-bellied sea snake)

Typhlopidae (blind snakes)

- Ramphotyphlops australis
- Ramphotyphlops bitubercu
- Ramphotyphlops diversus
- Ramphotyphlops endoterus
- Ramphotyphlops grypus
- Ramphotyphlops guentheri
- Ramphotyphlops hamatus
- Ramphotyphlops howi
- Ramphotyphlops kimberley
- Ramphotyphlops leptosoma
- Ramphotyphlops ligatus
- Ramphotyphlops margareta
- Ramphotyphlops micromma
- Ramphotyphlops pinguis
- Ramphotyphlops troglodyt
- Ramphotyphlops unguirost
- Ramphotyphlops waitii
- Ramphotyphlops yampiensi
