= Goldfields spiny-tailed gecko =

Conservation status
- Least Concern (IUCN 3.1)

Scientific classification
- Kingdom: Animalia
- Phylum: Chordata
- Class: Reptilia
- Order: Squamata
- Suborder: Gekkota
- Family: Diplodactylidae
- Genus: Strophurus
- Species: S. assimilis

Binomial name
- Strophurus assimilis (Storr, 1988)

Synonyms
- Diplodactylus assimilis Storr, 1988; Strophurus assimilis — Wells & Wellington, 1989

Species of lizard

The Goldfields spiny-tailed gecko (Strophurus assimilis) is a species of lizard in the family Diplodactylidae. The species is endemic to Australia.

== Taxonomy ==
The Goldfields spiny-tailed gecko was originally reported as a hybrid between the northern spiny-tailed gecko and southern spiny-tailed gecko. It was recognized as a valid species and given the scientific name Diplodactylus assimilis in 1988 by Glen Milton Storr, the specific name assimilis meaning 'similar' in Latin (in reference to its similarity to the eastern spiny-tailed gecko). It has since been moved to the genus Strophurus along with the other spiny-tailed geckos.

In 2023, it was found that some specimens assigned to Goldfields spiny-tailed gecko were actually part of a separate cryptic species based on molecular evidence. The cryptic species was split from Strophurus assimilis and named Strophurus spinula (the lesser thorn-tailed gecko).

== Description ==
This species reaches a snout-vent length of 53.7 to 80.8 mm, with a tail length being 49.3 to 66.3% the SVL. The body is mostly light or mid gray, sometimes with irregular dark markings. It has enlarged tan to orange tubercles arranged in a pair of parallel, mostly continuous, wavy lines down either side of the dorsal mid-line. The iris has a reticulated pattern surrounding by a dark brown ring.

== Distribution and habitat ==
S. assimilis is found in southern Western Australia, as well as South Australia in the Eyre Peninsula & Queen Victoria Desert.

The natural habitat of S. assimilis is mallee spinifex and acacia shrubland in arid and semiarid areas, often with red-brown sand.

== Reproduction ==
S. assimilis is oviparous.
