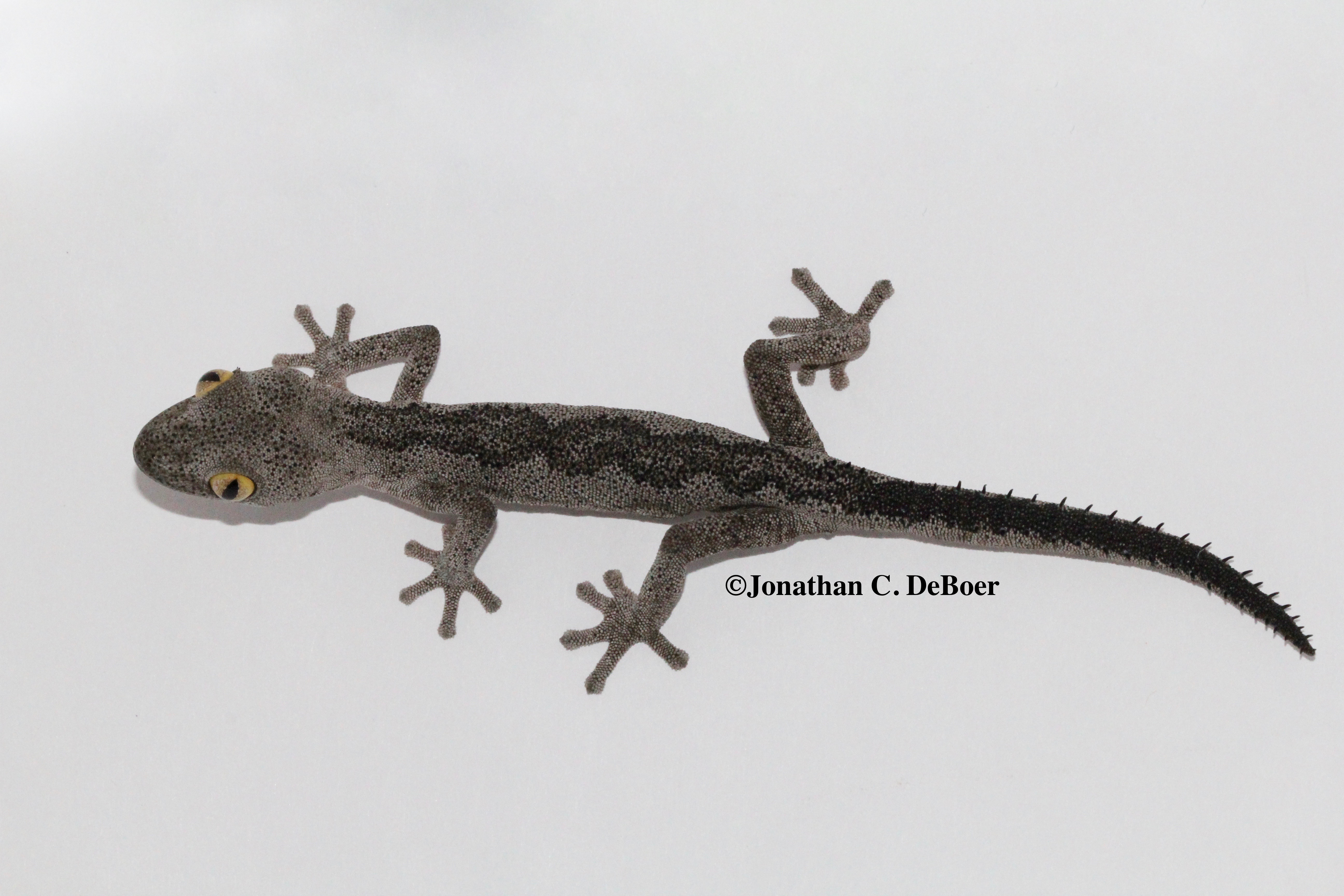

Conservation status
- Least Concern (IUCN 3.1)

Scientific classification
- Kingdom: Animalia
- Phylum: Chordata
- Class: Reptilia
- Order: Squamata
- Suborder: Gekkota
- Family: Diplodactylidae
- Genus: Strophurus
- Species: S. spinigerus

Binomial name
- Strophurus spinigerus (Gray, 1842)

Synonyms
- Diplodactylus spinigerus Gray, 1842; Strophura spinigera — Gray, 1845; Phyllodactylus spinigerus — A.H.A. Duméril, 1851; Diplodactylus strophurus spinigerus — Mitchell, 1955; Strophurus spinigerus — Wells & Wellington, 1984

= South-western spiny-tailed gecko =

Species of lizard from Australia (Strophurus spinigerus)

The south-western spiny-tailed gecko (Strophurus spinigerus), also known commonly as the soft spiny-tailed gecko, is a species of lizard in the family Diplodactylidae. The species is endemic to Australia. Two subspecies are recognized.

== Geographic range ==
S. spinigerus is found in the southwestern part of the Australian state of Western Australia.

== Habitat ==
The natural habitats of S. spinigerus are forest and shrubland.

== Description ==
S. spinigerus may attain a total length (including tail) of 11.4 cm (4.5 in). Dorsally, it is olive-grey, speckled with black. It may have a broad zigzag black stripe along the back. The spiny tubercles on the back and tail are black. Ventrally, it is dirty white, either uniform or speckled with black.

== Reproduction ==
S. spinigerus is oviparous.

== Subspecies ==
Two subspecies are recognized as being valid, including the nominotypical subspecies.

- Strophurus spinigerus inornatus (Storr, 1988)
- Strophurus spinigerus spinigerus (Gray, 1842)

Nota bene: A trinomial authority in parentheses indicates that the subspecies was originally described in a genus other than Strophurus.
