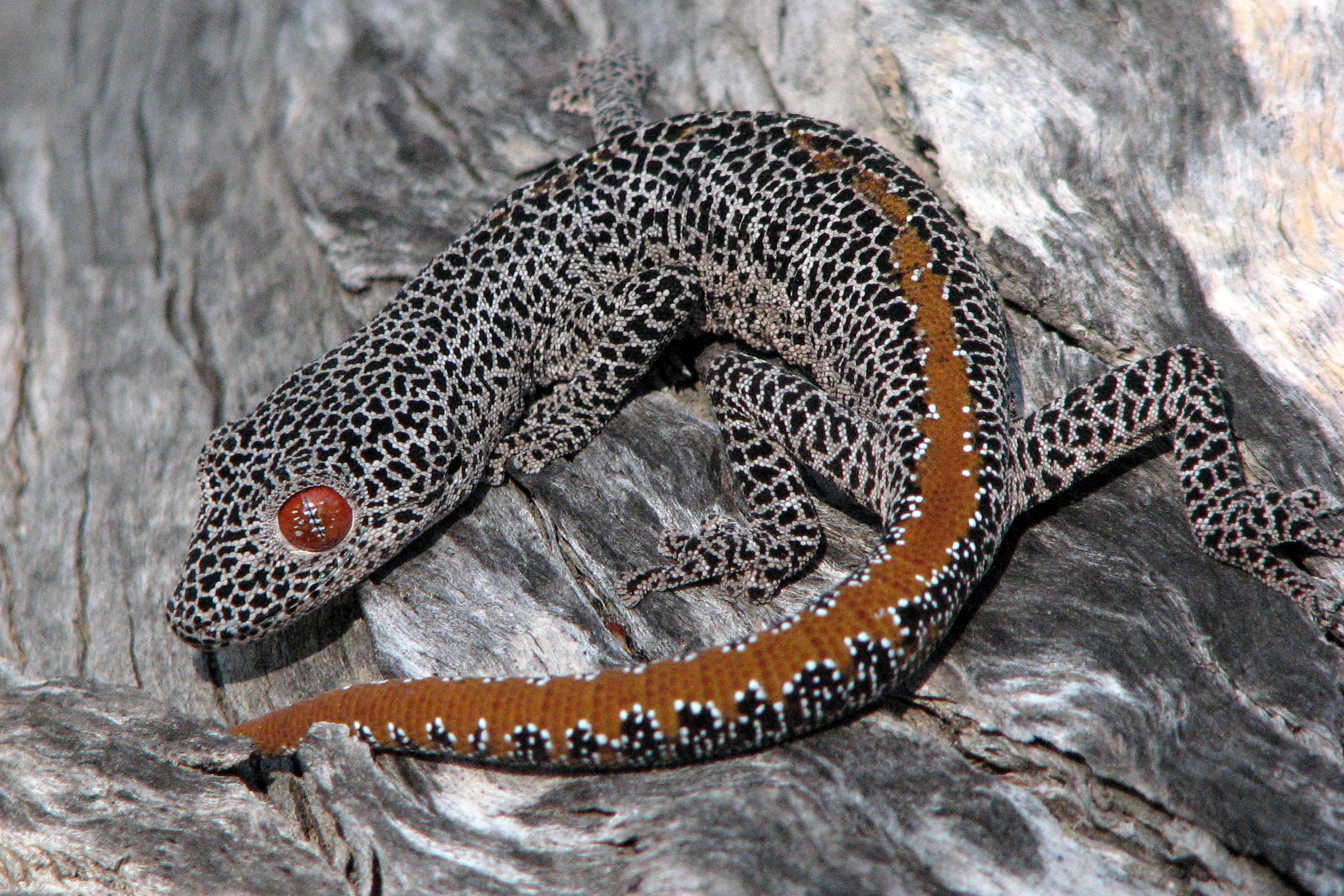

Conservation status
- Least Concern (IUCN 3.1)

Scientific classification
- Kingdom: Animalia
- Phylum: Chordata
- Class: Reptilia
- Order: Squamata
- Suborder: Gekkota
- Family: Diplodactylidae
- Genus: Strophurus
- Species: S. taenicauda

Binomial name
- Strophurus taenicauda (De Vis, 1886)

Synonyms
- Diplodactylus taenicauda De Vis, 1886; Diplodactylus taeniocauda [sic] Boulenger, 1887 (nomen substitutum); Diplodactylus taenicauda — Wermuth, 1965; Strophurus taenicauda — Wells & Wellington, 1984

= Strophurus taenicauda =

Species of lizard

Strophurus taenicauda, also known commonly as the golden spiny-tailed gecko or the golden-tailed gecko, is a species of lizard in the family Diplodactylidae. The species is endemic to eastern Australia. Three subspecies are recognized.

== Geographic range ==
S. taenicauda is found in New South Wales and Queensland, Australia.

== Habitat ==
The preferred habitats of S. taenicauda are shrubland and forest, especially areas including the white cypress.

== Defense mechanism ==
The golden-tailed gecko can produce a spray of foul-smelling liquid from its tail as an anti-predator adaptation.

== Reproduction ==
S. taenicauda is oviparous.

== Subspecies ==
The following three subspecies, including the nominotypical subspecies, are recognized as being valid.

- Strophurus taenicauda albiocularis, This Species has a greenish eye, with smaller dots that line this species skin, it has a golden tail and has a brownish skin color, unlike other species. D. Brown, Worthington Wilmer & Macdonald, 2012
- Strophurus taenicauda taenicauda This species has larger black dots, with a grey skin colour, it is identifyable with its anber red eye. (De Vis, 1886)
- Strophurus taenicauda triaureus, it is very similar to taenicauda, but has an eye color slightly more yellow, it also has smaller black dot along its skin. D. Brown, Worthington Wilmer & Macdonald, 2012

Nota bene: A trinomial authority in parentheses indicates that the subspecies was originally described in a genus other than Strophurus.
