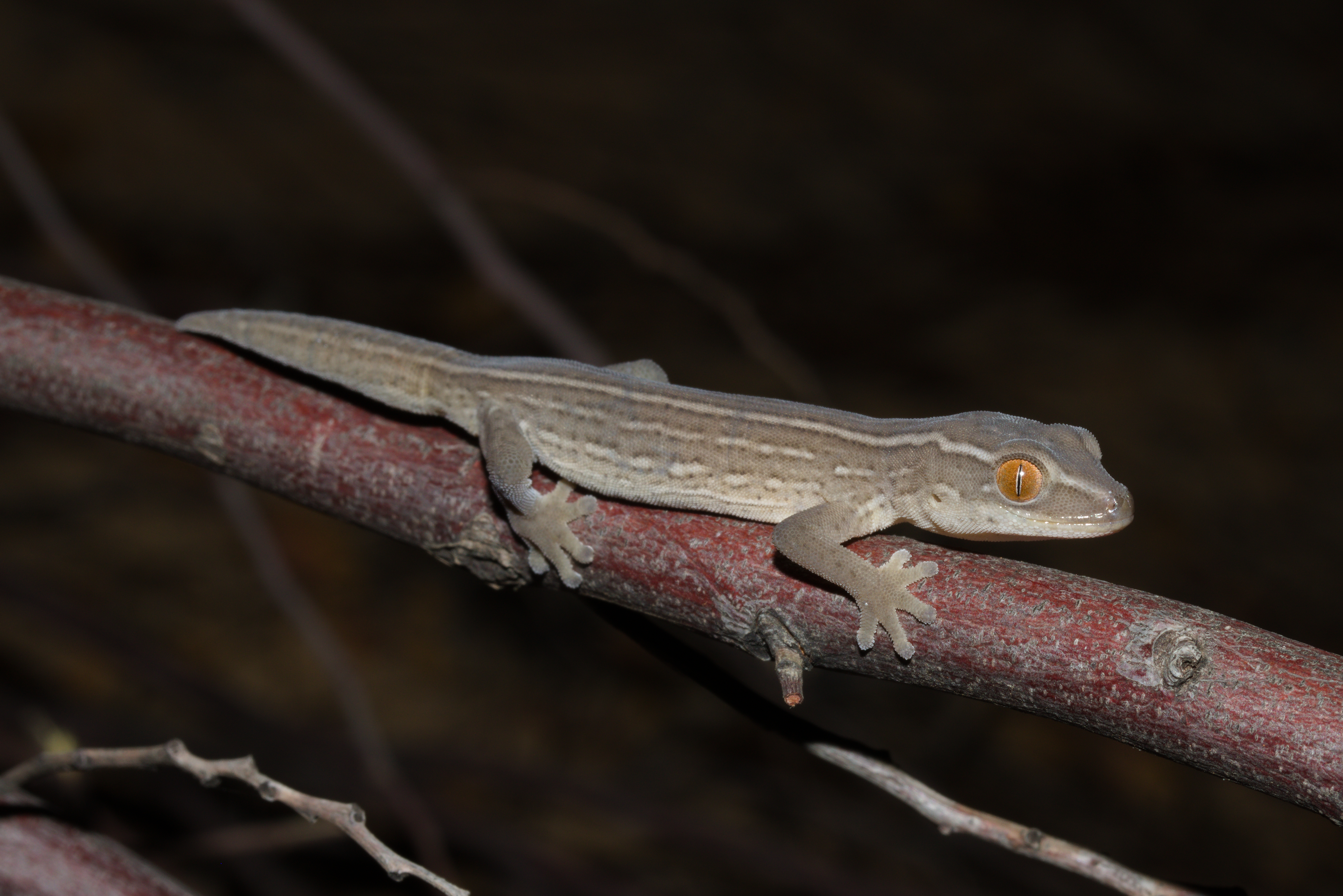

Conservation status
- Least Concern (IUCN 3.1)

Scientific classification
- Kingdom: Animalia
- Phylum: Chordata
- Class: Reptilia
- Order: Squamata
- Suborder: Gekkota
- Family: Diplodactylidae
- Genus: Strophurus
- Species: S. michaelseni

Binomial name
- Strophurus michaelseni (F. Werner, 1910)

Synonyms
- Diplodactylus michaelseni F. Werner, 1910; Oedurella michaelseni — Lönnberg & Andersson, 1913; Strophurus michaelseni — Wells & Wellington, 1984

= Robust striped gecko =

Species of lizard

The robust striped gecko (Strophurus michaelseni), also known commonly as Michaelsen's spiny-tailed gecko, is a species of lizard in the family Diplodactylidae. The species is endemic to Australia.

== Etymology ==
The specific name, michaelseni, is in honour of German zoologist Wilhelm Michaelsen.

== Geographic range ==
Strophurus michaelseni is found on the central coast and in the adjacent interior of Western Australia, Australia.

== Habitat ==
The natural habitats of Strophurus michaelseni are forest, shrubland, and grassland.

== Reproduction ==
Strophurus michaelseni is oviparous.
