= Strophurus taeniatus =

Conservation status
- Least Concern (IUCN 3.1)

Scientific classification
- Kingdom: Animalia
- Phylum: Chordata
- Class: Reptilia
- Order: Squamata
- Suborder: Gekkota
- Family: Diplodactylidae
- Genus: Strophurus
- Species: S. taeniatus

Binomial name
- Strophurus taeniatus (Lönnberg & Andersson, 1913)

Synonyms
- Oedurella taeniata Lönnberg & Andersson, 1913; Diplodactylus taeniatus — Cogger, 1975; Strophurus taeniatus — Wells & Wellington, 1984

Species of lizard

Strophurus taeniatus, also known commonly as the phasmid striped gecko or the white-striped gecko, is a species of lizard in the family Diplodactylidae. The species is endemic to Australia.

== Geographic range ==
S. taeniatus is found in the northern parts of the Australian states and territories of Northern Territory, Queensland, and Western Australia.

== Habitat ==
The preferred habitats of S. taeniatus are grassland and rocky areas.

== Reproduction ==
S. taeniatus is oviparous.
