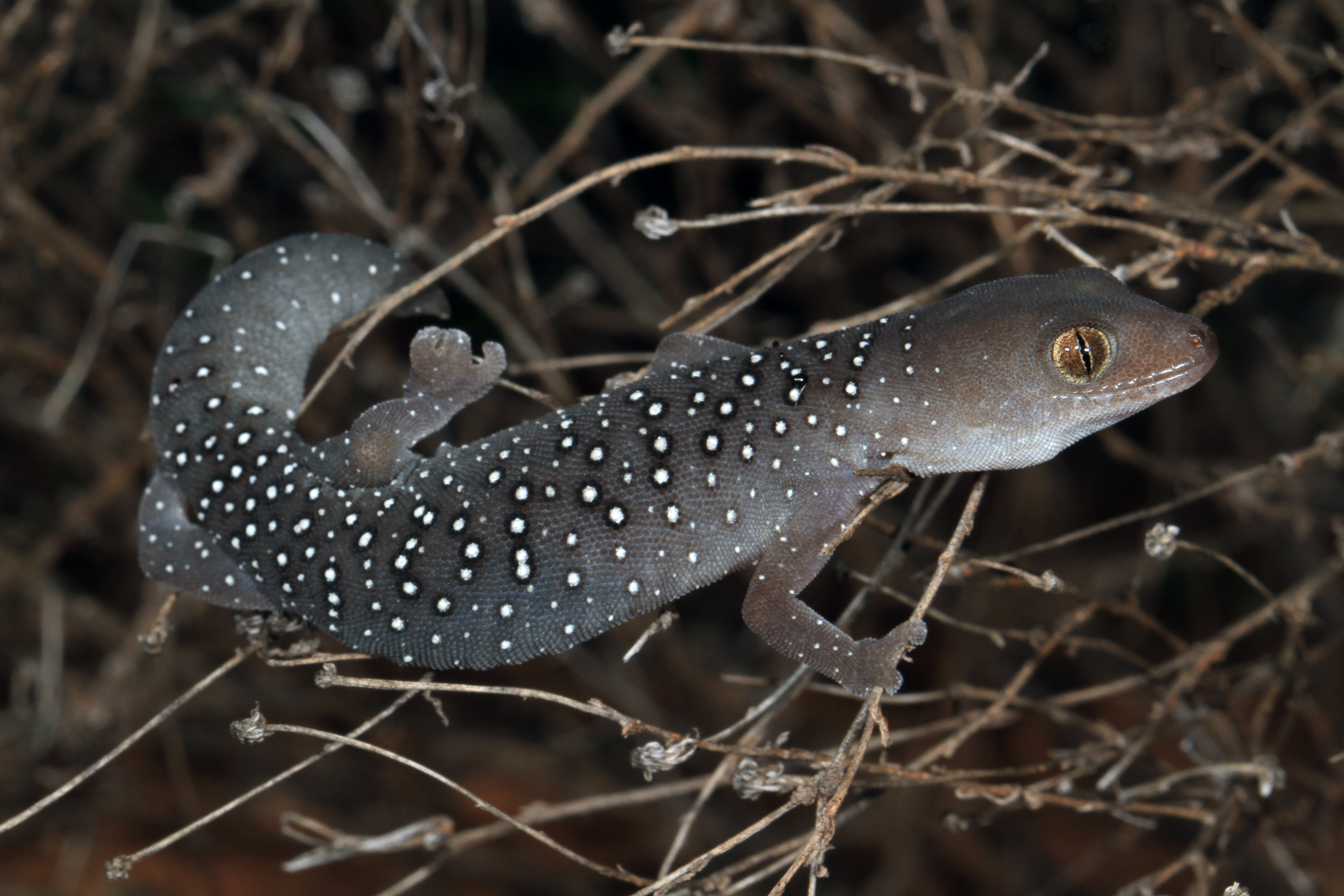

Conservation status
- Least Concern (IUCN 3.1)

Scientific classification
- Kingdom: Animalia
- Phylum: Chordata
- Class: Reptilia
- Order: Squamata
- Suborder: Gekkota
- Family: Diplodactylidae
- Genus: Strophurus
- Species: S. elderi

Binomial name
- Strophurus elderi (Stirling & Zietz, 1893)

Synonyms
- Diplodactylus elderi Stirling & Zietz, 1893; Strophurus elderi — Wells & Wellington, 1984; Eremiastrophurus elderi — Wells & Wellington, 1985; Eremiastrophurus mahoodi Wells & Wellington, 1985; Strophurus elderi — Greer, 1989; Strophurus elderi — Cogger, 2014

= Strophurus elderi =

Species of lizard

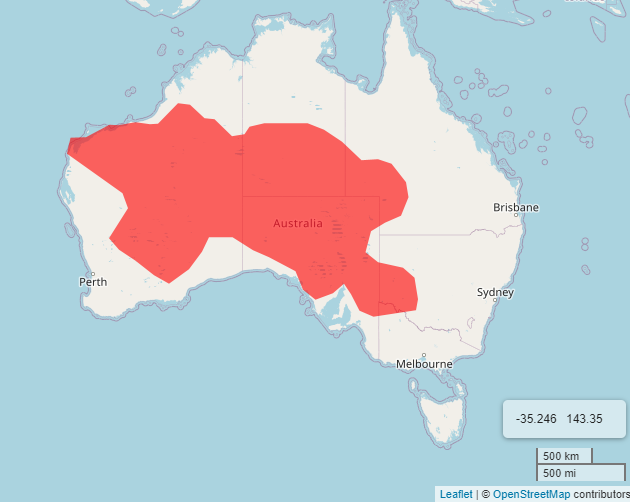
Strophurus Elderi Distribution - Atlas of Living Australia records

Strophurus elderi, also known commonly as the jewelled gecko, is a terrestrial, nocturnal species of gecko, a lizard in the family Diplodactylidae. Previously classified within the genus Diplodactylus, S. elderi is one of 22 geckos belonging to the genus Strophurus. The species is endemic to the arid regions of central and north-western Australia.

== Etymology ==
The specific name, elderi, is in honor of Scottish-Australian philanthropist Thomas Elder.

== Description ==
S. elderi is a dark-coloured, soft-bodied, and moderately sized lizard from the family Diplodactylidae – measuring 65-75mm or 45mm from snout to vent. The tail is fleshy and moderate, equating to 55% of the snout-vent length. Dorsal colours are dark brown to velvety grey with scattered dark-edged white spots corresponding to enlarged tubercules (rosette of scales with an enlarged central scale). The ventral colouring is dirty white with darker and paler flecks and spots. Eyes are brown-grey with a vertical slit and are covered by a transparent convex disc which is cleaned and moistened regularly using their broad, fleshy mobile tongue. The eye cover is shed periodically along with the outer skin layer. Digits feature tiny retractile claws which sit within a groove between distal lamellae. The subdigital pads are expanded and specially modified to grip the slender (<1 cm in diameter), spiny foliage of spinifex grass (triodia sp.). S.elderi is distinguishable from other Strophurus species due to a lack precloacal pores, caudal ornamentation and bright oral mucosa.

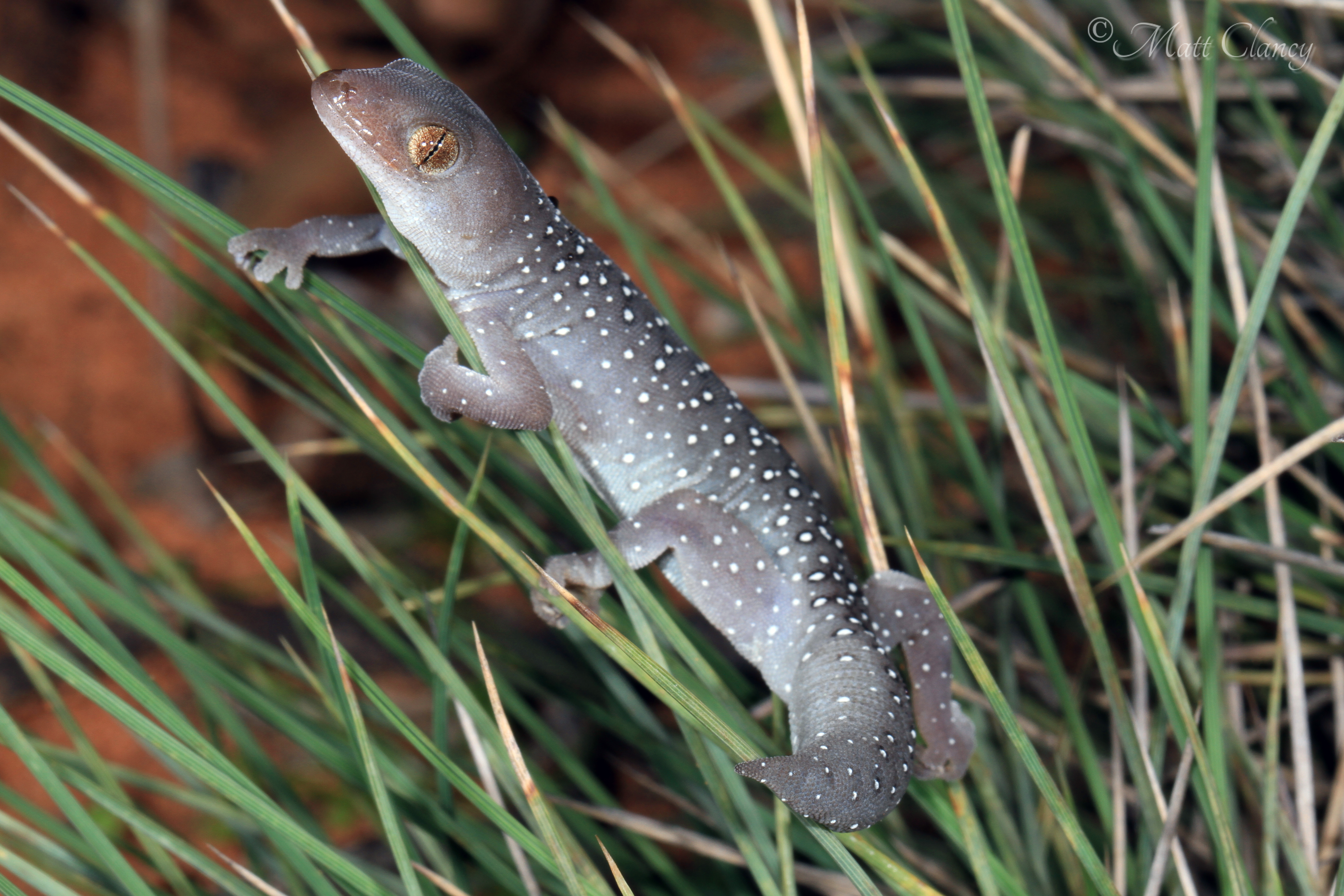
Jewelled Gecko

== Defence strategies ==
S. elderi's spotted colour pattern is thought to be a mechanism for camouflage within spinifex clumps. Like other members of the geckkonidae family, S. elderi is autotomous, meaning that it can self-amputate its tail when grasped by a predatory agent. However, they do this with a lower frequency when compared with other gecko species, which may be due to increased functionality. As a member of the Strophurus genus, S. elderi possesses paired, mid-dorsal glands running the tail length, which forcibly eject a viscous, highly adhesive, slightly malodorous liquid up to 50 cm towards antagonists.

== Geographic range ==
S. elderi is present in many Australian arid regions including states and territories of New South Wales, Northern Territory, Queensland, South Australia, and Western Australia. S. elderi is found within spinifex-dominated landscapes, on red sandy plains, sandy dunes and occasionally on stony hills. In addition, spinifex often occurs in association with hummock grasslands, mallee and acacia woodlands and shrublands.

== Ecology and habitat ==
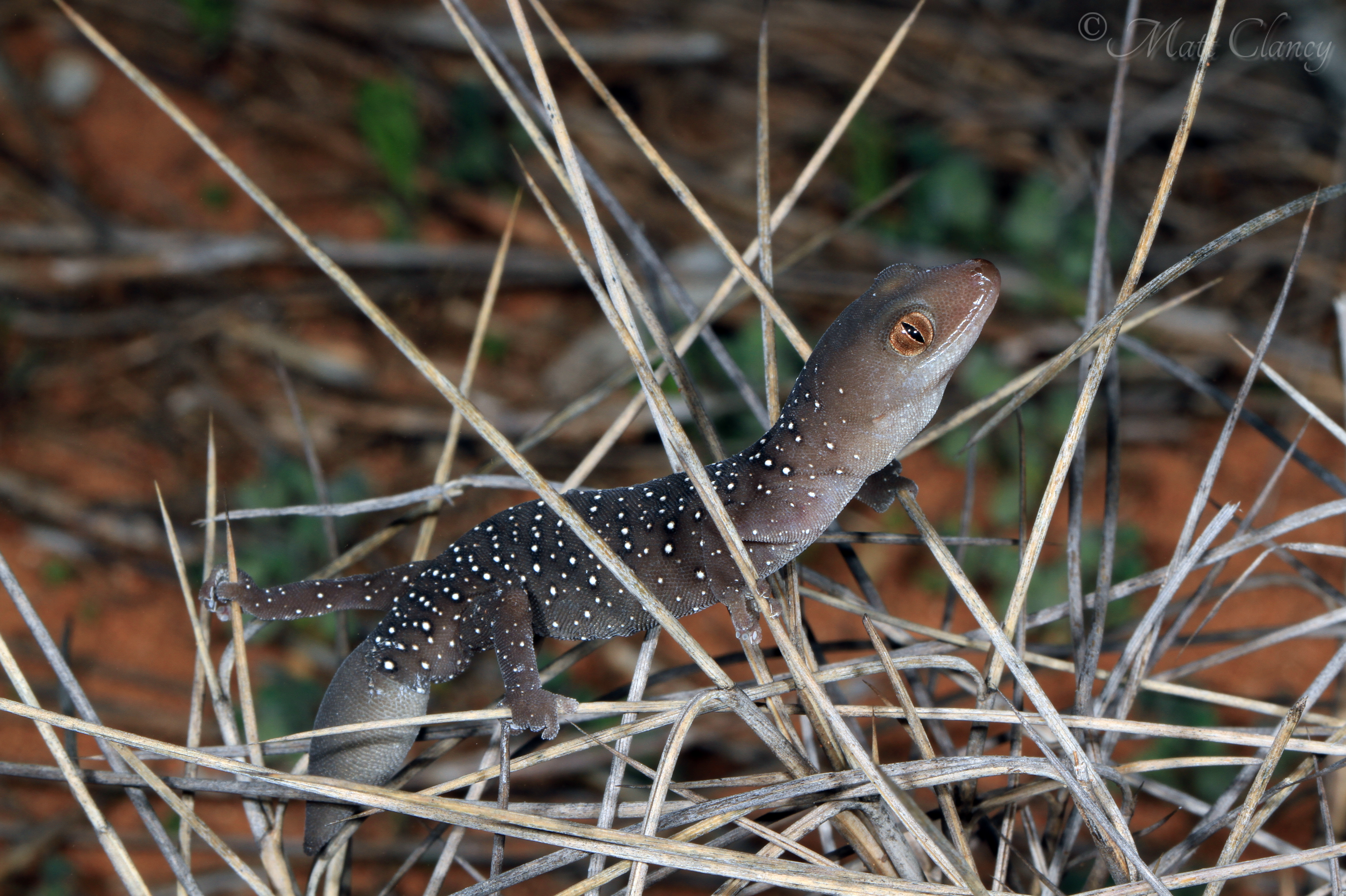
Strophurus Elderi in the Murray Mallee SA

S. elderi is a graminicolous (grass-dwelling) species and lives and forages almost exclusively within spinifex (triodia sp.) hummocks. Spinifex provides an ideal microclimatic niche by providing shelter and protection from predators. Spinifex occurs as a low, dense hemispherical dome, less than 1.5 m (4.9 ft) tall, that expands outwards from the centre to form rings; as leaf growth continues, the centre dies off to form a dense matted mound of needle-sharp spines. Spinifex remains significantly cooler than the surrounding bare ground, and its robust and binding root structure provides an ideal burrowing substrate. As a nocturnal species, S. elderi takes refuge within or underneath spinifex hummocks during the day and forages within and around spinifex at night. S. elderi perches at a lower height than many Strophurus species and will wait in ambush at 20–100 cm (7.9–39.4 in) above the ground. S. elderi is insectivorous, eating a variety of small invertebrates such as small crickets, caterpillars, grubs, termites, spiders, cockroaches and moths.

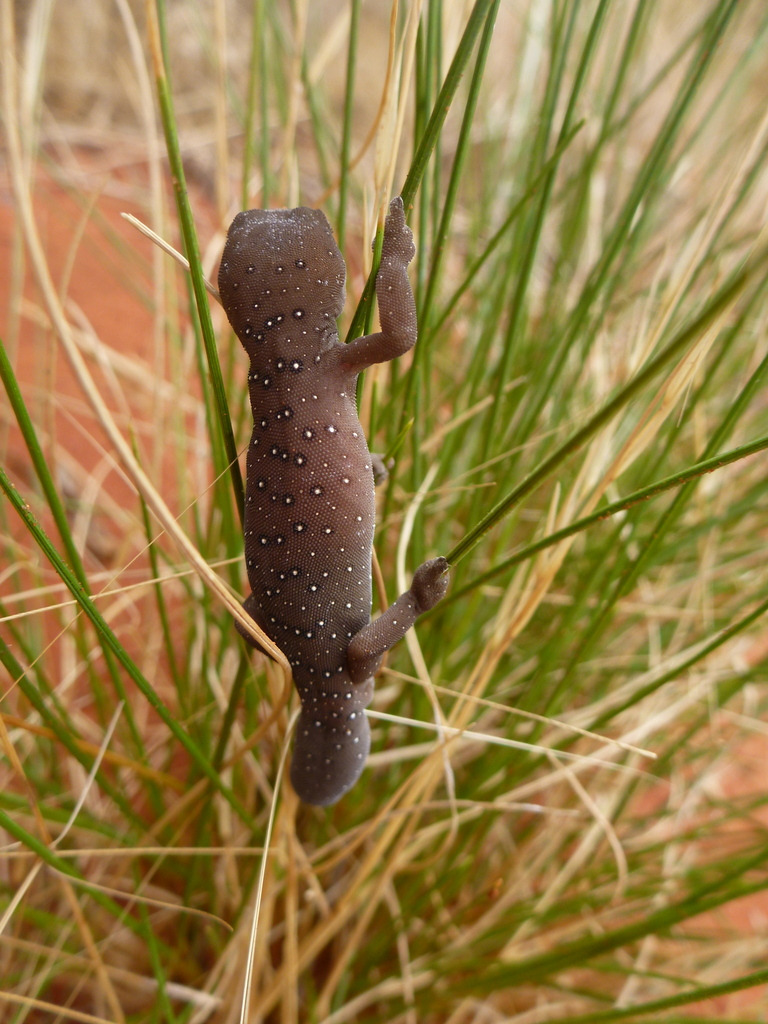
Jewelled gecko on Angas Downs

== Reproduction ==
S. elderi is oviparous meaning that the species produces eggs that hatch outside the body. Females lay eggs in a clutch of two, and more than one clutch may be produced in a season.

== Threats ==
S. elderi was listed as vulnerable under the NSW Threatened Species Conservation Act on 25 October 2004. The species is classified as the least concern under the IUCN. S. elderi is currently threatened by habitat loss and destruction due to clearance, changes to grazing regimes, alterations in fire frequency and intensity, and predation by feral animals such as cats and foxes. One known predator is Burton's legless lizard, lialis burtonis.
