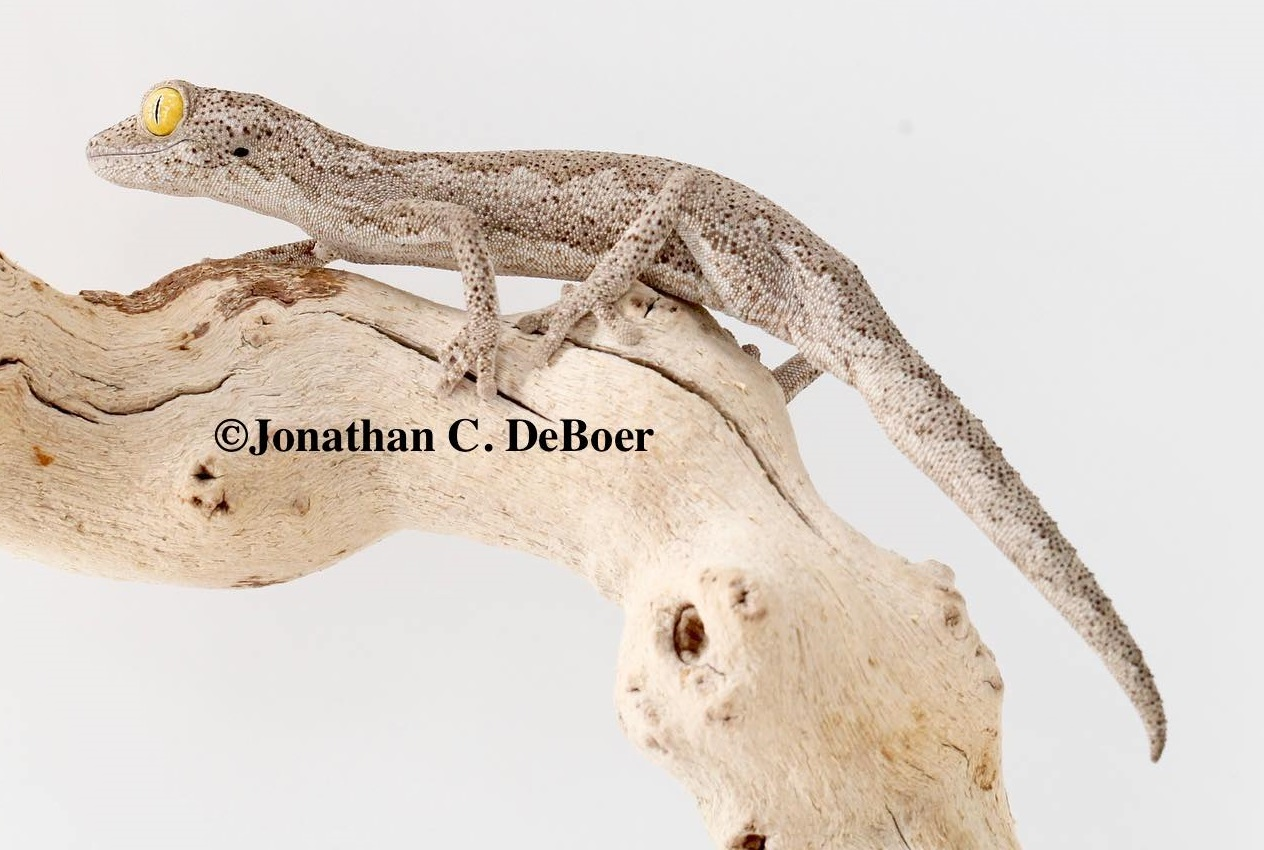

Conservation status
- Least Concern (IUCN 3.1)

Scientific classification
- Kingdom: Animalia
- Phylum: Chordata
- Class: Reptilia
- Order: Squamata
- Suborder: Gekkota
- Family: Diplodactylidae
- Genus: Strophurus
- Species: S. rankini

Binomial name
- Strophurus rankini (Storr, 1979)

Synonyms
- Diplodactylus rankini Storr, 1979; Strophurus rankini — Wells & Wellington, 1984

= Exmouth spiny-tailed gecko =

Species of lizard

The Exmouth spiny-tailed gecko (Strophurus rankini), also known commonly as Rankin's spiny-tailed gecko, is a species of lizard in the family Diplodactylidae. The species is endemic to Western Australia.

== Etymology ==
The specific name, rankini, is in honor of Australian herpetologist Peter Rankin (1955–1979), who was collecting lizards at night in New Caledonia, when he fell from a tree and died.

== Geographic range ==
S. rankini is found in the Exmouth Gulf region of coastal Western Australia, including Bernier Island.

== Habitat ==
The natural habitat of S. rankini is shrubland in the supralittoral zone.

== Description ==
S. rankini may attain a snout-to-vent length (SVL) of 6.3 cm (2.5 in). The length of the tail is about two-thirds the SVL. Dorsally, S. rankini is pale gray, darker on the snout and lips. Ventrally, it is grayish white.

== Reproduction ==
S. rankini is oviparous.
