= Western spiny-tailed gecko =

Conservation status
- Least Concern (IUCN 3.1)

Scientific classification
- Kingdom: Animalia
- Phylum: Chordata
- Class: Reptilia
- Order: Squamata
- Suborder: Gekkota
- Family: Diplodactylidae
- Genus: Strophurus
- Species: S. strophurus

Binomial name
- Strophurus strophurus (A.M.C. Duméril & Bibron, 1836)

Synonyms
- Phyllodactylus strophurus A.M.C. Duméril & Bibron, 1836; Discodactylus dumerilli Fitzinger, 1843; Phyllodactylus dumerilli — A.H.A. Duméril, 1856; Diplodactylus strophurus Boulenger, 1885; Strophurus strophurus — Wells & Wellington, 1984

Species of lizard

The western spiny-tailed gecko (Strophurus strophurus) is a species of lizard in the family Diplodactylidae. The species is endemic to Australia.

== Geographic range ==
S. strophurus is found in the Australian state of Western Australia.

== Habitat ==
The natural habitat of S. strophurus is shrubland.

== Reproduction ==
S. strophurus is oviparous.
