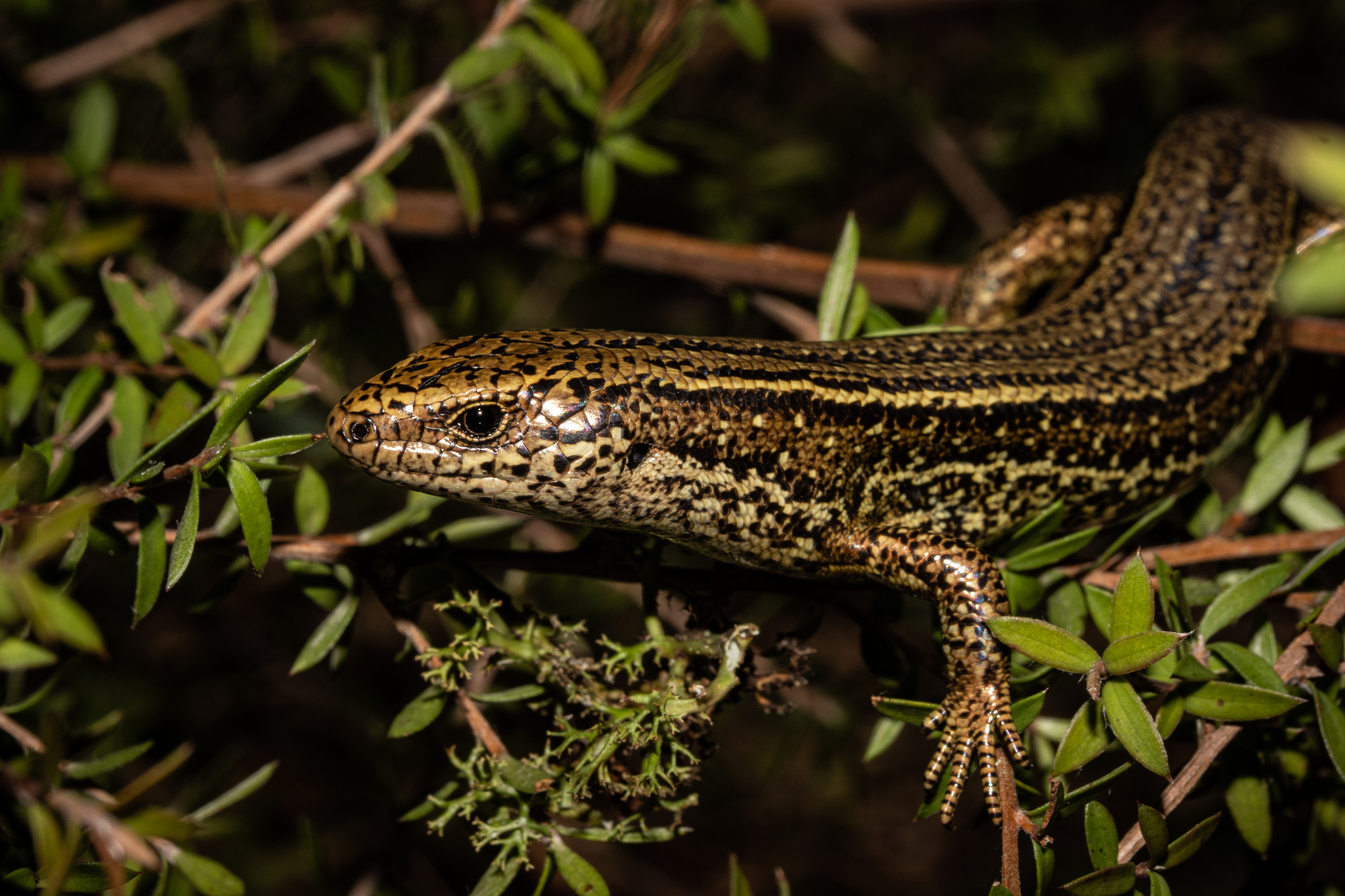

Scientific classification
- Kingdom: Animalia
- Phylum: Chordata
- Class: Reptilia
- Order: Squamata
- Family: Scincidae
- Genus: Oligosoma
- Species: O. robinsoni

Binomial name
- Oligosoma robinsoni (Wells & Wellington, 1985)
- Distribution of Oligosoma robinsoni on a map of the North Island Known native range

= Oligosoma robinsoni =

Species of reptile

The crenulate skink, Hokitika skink, or cobble skink (Oligosoma robinsoni) is a species of skink found in New Zealand.

== Distribution ==
This skink is found in central New Zealand.

== Conservation status ==
It is classified by the New Zealand Department of Conservation as Nationally Vulnerable.
