= Short-tailed striped gecko =

Conservation status
- Least Concern (IUCN 3.1)

Scientific classification
- Kingdom: Animalia
- Phylum: Chordata
- Class: Reptilia
- Order: Squamata
- Suborder: Gekkota
- Family: Diplodactylidae
- Genus: Strophurus
- Species: S. mcmillani

Binomial name
- Strophurus mcmillani (Storr, 1978)

Synonyms
- Diplodactylus mcmillani Storr, 1978; Oedurella mcmillani — Wells & Wellington, 1989; Strophurus mcmillani — Greer, 1989

Species of lizard

The short-tailed striped gecko (Strophurus mcmillani), also known commonly as McMillan's spiny-tailed gecko, is a species of lizard in the family Diplodactylidae. The species is endemic to Australia.

== Etymology ==
The specific name, mcmillani, is in honor of Australian entomologist Robert Peter McMillan (1921–2009).

== Geographic distribution ==
In Australia, Strophurus mcmillani is found in extreme northwestern Northern Territory and in Western Australia.

== Habitat ==
The natural habitats of Strophurus mcmillani are grassland and rocky areas.

== Description ==
Strophurus mcmillani has an average snout-to-vent length (SVL) of 4.5 cm (1.8 in), and the average tail length is 61% of the SVL. Dorsally and laterally, it is olive grey, with dark brown and white stripes.

== Reproduction ==
Strophurus mcmillani is oviparous.
