= Mount Augustus spiny-tailed gecko =

Conservation status
- Least Concern (IUCN 3.1)

Scientific classification
- Kingdom: Animalia
- Phylum: Chordata
- Class: Reptilia
- Order: Squamata
- Suborder: Gekkota
- Family: Diplodactylidae
- Genus: Strophurus
- Species: S. wilsoni

Binomial name
- Strophurus wilsoni (Storr, 1983)

Synonyms
- Diplodactylus wilsoni Storr, 1983; Strophurus wilsoni — Wells & Wellington, 1984

Species of lizard

The Mount Augustus spiny-tailed gecko (Strophurus wilsoni), also known commonly as the Mount Augustus striped gecko and Wilson's spiny-tailed gecko, is a species of lizard in the family Diplodactylidae. The species is endemic to Australia.

== Etymology ==
The specific name, wilsoni, is in honor of Australian herpetologist Stephen Karl "Steve" Wilson.

== Geographic range ==
S. wilsoni is found in western Western Australia.

== Habitat ==
The natural habitat of S. wilsoni is shrubland.

== Reproduction ==
S. wilsoni is oviparous.
