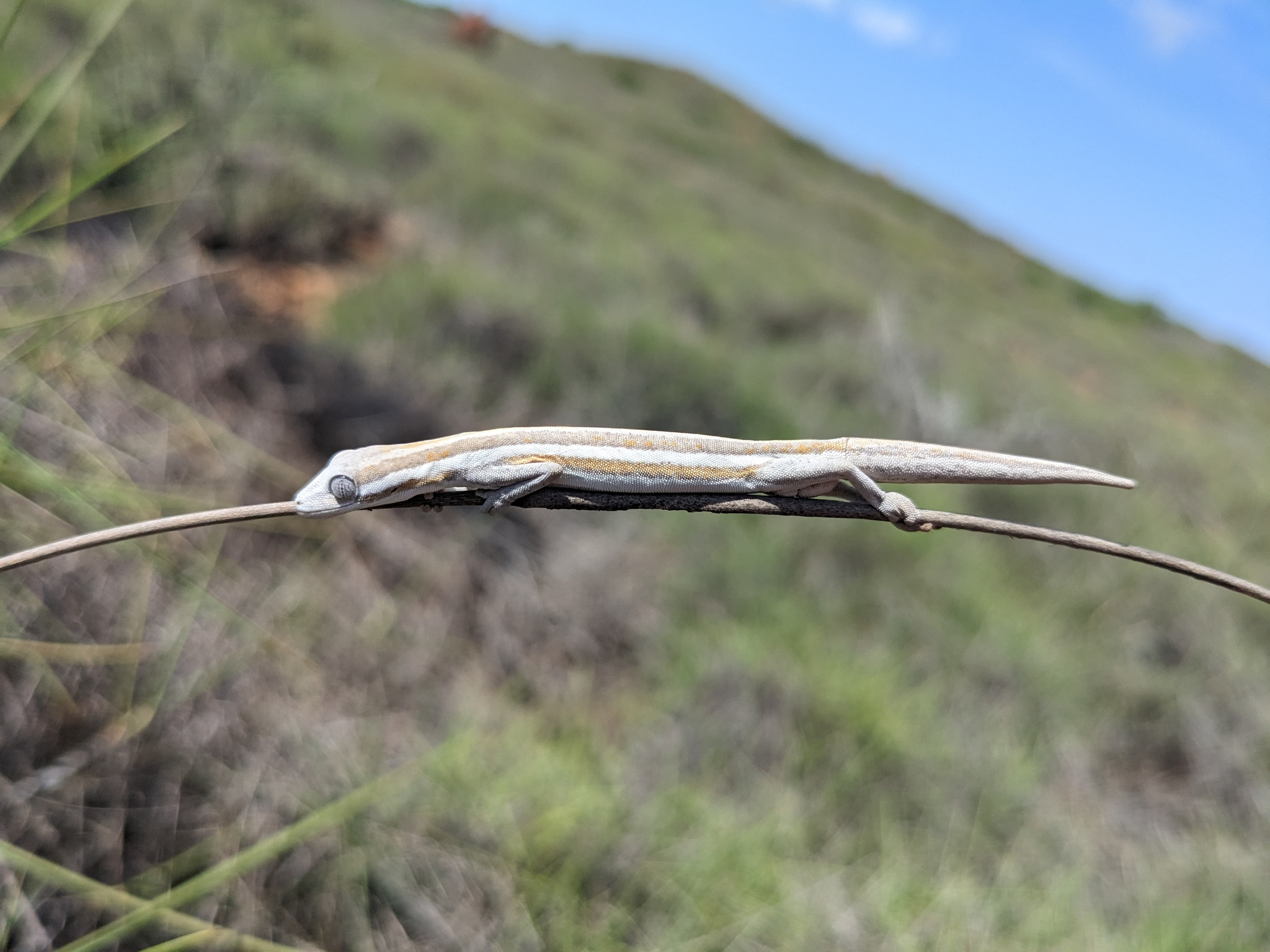
- Western Australia, April 2023

Conservation status
- Least Concern (IUCN 3.1)

Scientific classification
- Kingdom: Animalia
- Phylum: Chordata
- Class: Reptilia
- Order: Squamata
- Suborder: Gekkota
- Family: Diplodactylidae
- Genus: Strophurus
- Species: S. jeanae

Binomial name
- Strophurus jeanae (Storr, 1988)

Synonyms
- Diplodactylus jeanae Storr, 1988; Oedurella jeanae — Wells & Wellington, 1989; Strophurus jeanae — Greer, 1989

= Strophurus jeanae =

Species of lizard

Strophurus jeanae, also known commonly as the southern phasmid gecko and Jean's spiny-tailed gecko, is a species of gecko, a lizard in the family Gekkonidae. The species is endemic to Australia.

== Etymology ==
The specific name, jeanae, is in honor of Miss Jean White, Department of Ornithology and Herpetology, Western Australian Museum.

== Geographic range ==
In Australia S. jeanae is found in northern Northern Territory and northern Western Australia.

== Habitat ==
The preferred natural habitats of S. jeanae are grassland and shrubland in arid zones.

== Description ==
S. jeanae may attain a snout-to-vent length (SVL) of 4.9 cm (1.9 in). It is striped, slender-bodied, and thin-legged. The rostral is in contact with the nostril.

== Defensive behavior ==
If threatened, S. jeanae may gape its mouth to display the bright yellow lining. It may also squirt a bright orange viscous fluid from glands in the tail.

== Reproduction ==
S. jeanae is oviparous.
