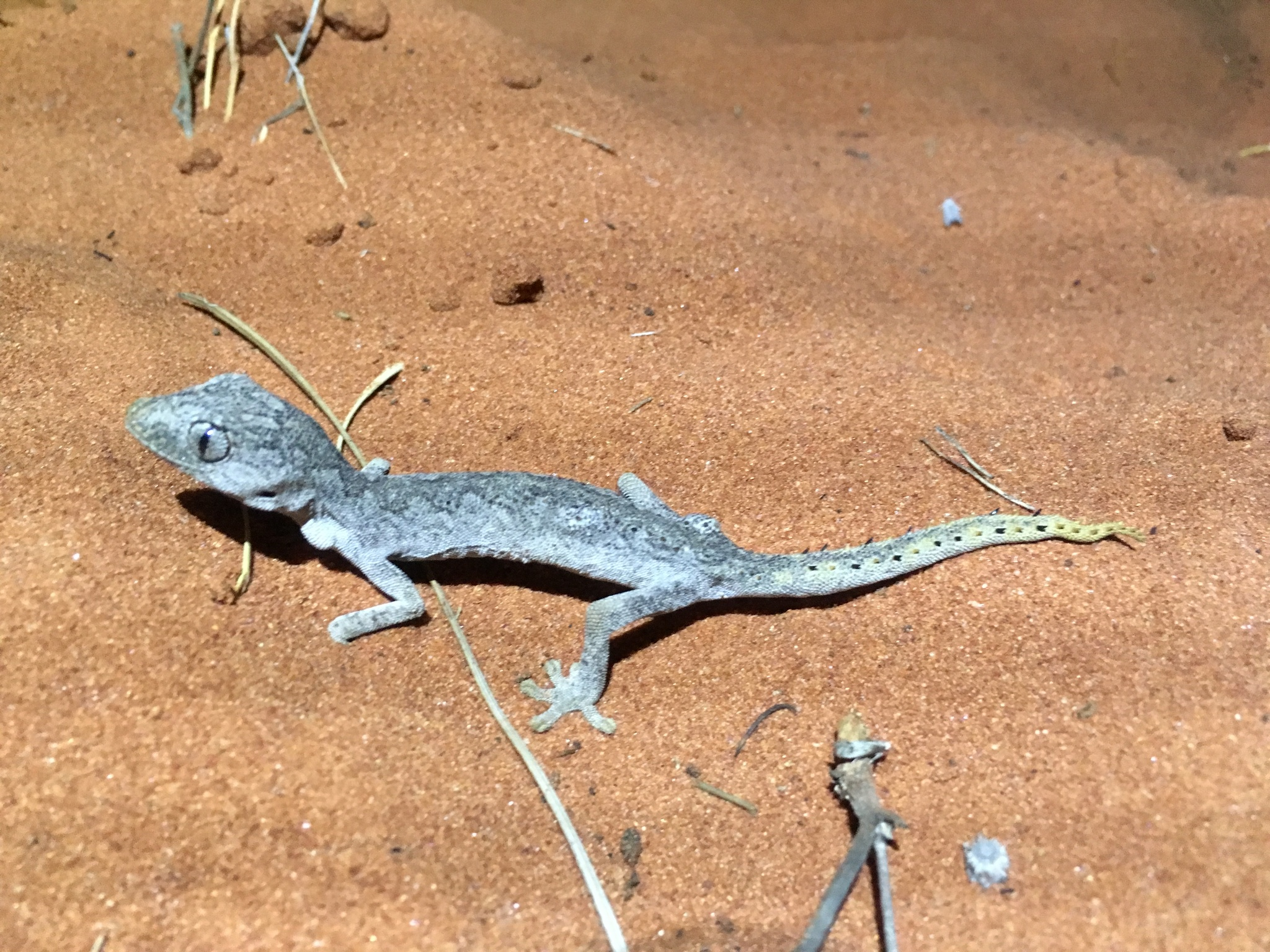

Conservation status
- Least Concern (IUCN 3.1)

Scientific classification
- Kingdom: Animalia
- Phylum: Chordata
- Class: Reptilia
- Order: Squamata
- Suborder: Gekkota
- Family: Diplodactylidae
- Genus: Strophurus
- Species: S. ciliaris

Binomial name
- Strophurus ciliaris (Boulenger, 1885)

Synonyms
- Diplodactylus ciliaris Boulenger, 1885; Diplodactylus spinigerus ciliaris — Loveridge, 1934; Strophurus ciliaris — Wells & Wellington, 1985

= Northern spiny-tailed gecko =

Species of lizard

The northern spiny-tailed gecko (Strophurus ciliaris) is a species of lizard in the family Diplodactylidae. The species is endemic to Australia.

== Etymology ==
The meaning of the scientific name or binomial, Strophurus ciliaris, comes from strophurus meaning "turning-tail" and ciliaris meaning "eyelashed", referring to the spines above the eyes.

== Description ==
S. ciliaris is highly variable in colour. This species can vary from a uniform grey colour, with few black or orange scales, to rich brown, with a mottled pattern of grey, white, and orange scales. Spines are present along the tail, and long spines are generally present above the eyes, giving the impression of being eye-lashed. The average length for a member of this species is 89 mm (3.5 in). Females are known to be significantly larger than males.

== Reproduction ==
S. ciliaris an oviparous species that has a clutch size of two.

== Defence ==
Members of the genus Strophurus have the ability to squirt a harmless, smelly, fluid from their tails. This is used as a deterrent for birds and other predations whilst they are perching in shrubs. Another defence mechanism that S. ciliaris has is bright palate colour.

== Behaviour and habitat ==
The northern spiny-tailed gecko is generally a nocturnal species but can be found basking during the day. It is an arboreal species which occurs in arid, semi-arid, and subtropical habitats in shrubland. It can also be commonly found in clumps of spinifex.

== Conservation status ==
S. ciliaris is currently listed as Least Concern on the IUCN Red List. This is due to its large distribution, unrestricted habitat preferences, and the limited number of threats facing this species.

== Diet ==
Little is known about the diet of this S. ciliaris. However, similar to other members of the gecko families, its diet includes arthropods. It has been observed licking the exudes of wattle sap.

== Geographic range ==
The northern spiny-tailed gecko occurs in the interior of Australia, and its range extends from the northwest region of New South Wales and western Queensland through to South Australia and the Northern Territory, and then stretches into Western Australia.

Of the recorded occurrences of this species, 48 percent have been recorded in the Northern Territory, 31.2 percent in Western Australia, 10.9 percent in South Australia, and the remaining across New South Wales and Queensland. There have been no recorded occurrences of this species in Victoria.

== Subspecies ==
S. ciliaris has one desert form and one tropical form. There are two subspecies, Strophurus ciliaris ciliaris and Strophurus ciliaris aberrans.

== Threats ==
Habitat degradation is a threat to the northern spiny-tailed gecko. A large amount of this species' habitat has been lost or heavily degraded by land clearing and feral invasive species including goats. Habitat degradation and loss should not be considered a major threat at this time due to the wide distribution and a large amount of suitable habitat that remains.
