= Strophurus robinsoni =

Conservation status
- Least Concern (IUCN 3.1)

Scientific classification
- Kingdom: Animalia
- Phylum: Chordata
- Class: Reptilia
- Order: Squamata
- Suborder: Gekkota
- Family: Diplodactylidae
- Genus: Strophurus
- Species: S. robinsoni

Binomial name
- Strophurus robinsoni (L.A. Smith, 1995)

Synonyms
- Diplodactylus robinsoni L.A. Smith, 1945; Strophurus robinsoni — Rösler, 2000

Species of lizard

Strophurus robinsoni is a species of gecko, a lizard in the family Diplodactylidae. The species is endemic to Australia.

== Etymology ==
The specific name, robinsoni, is in honor of Australian herpetologist David Robinson.

== Geographic range ==
In Australia, S. robinsoni is found in Northern Territory and Western Australia.

== Habitat ==
The preferred habitats of S. robinsoni are grassland and rocky areas.

== Reproduction ==
S. robinsoni is oviparous.
