= Congoo gecko =

Conservation status
- Data Deficient (IUCN 3.1)

Scientific classification
- Kingdom: Animalia
- Phylum: Chordata
- Class: Reptilia
- Order: Squamata
- Suborder: Gekkota
- Family: Diplodactylidae
- Genus: Strophurus
- Species: S. congoo

Binomial name
- Strophurus congoo Vanderduys, 2016

Species of lizard

The Congoo gecko (Strophurus congoo) is a species of lizard in the family Diplodactylidae. The species is endemic to Australia.

== Etymology ==
The specific name, congoo, is in honor of the Congoo family who have native title to the land on which the holotype was collected.

== Geographic range ==
S. congoo is found in northern Queensland, Australia.

== Habitat ==
The preferred habitat of S. congoo is forest.
