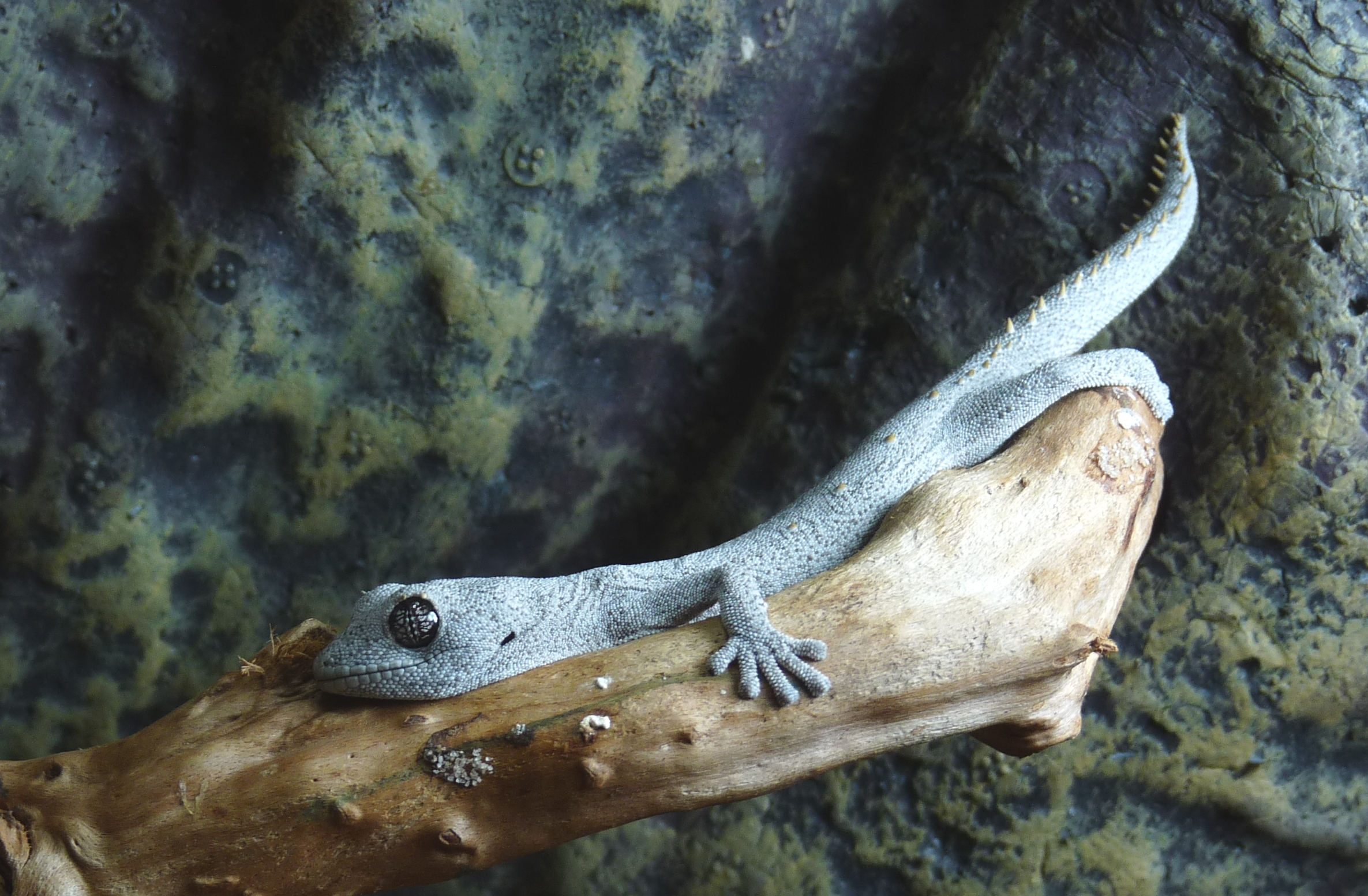

Conservation status
- Least Concern (IUCN 3.1)

Scientific classification
- Kingdom: Animalia
- Phylum: Chordata
- Class: Reptilia
- Order: Squamata
- Suborder: Gekkota
- Family: Diplodactylidae
- Genus: Strophurus
- Species: S. krisalys

Binomial name
- Strophurus krisalys Sadlier, O'Meally & Shea, 2005

= Strophurus krisalys =

Species of lizard

Strophurus krisalys is a species of gecko, a lizard in the family Diplodactylidae. The species is endemic to Australia.

== Etymology ==
The specific name, krisalys, is in honor of Kristin Alys Sadlier.

== Description ==
S. krisalys may attain a snout-to-vent length (SVL) of 7 cm (2.8 in). It has spines above its eyes, and the lining of its mouth is deep blue.

== Geographic range ==
S. krisalys is found in the Australian state of Queensland.

== Habitat ==
The preferred habitats of S. krisalys are forest, savanna, and shrubland.

== Behaviour ==
S. krisalys is arboreal.

== Reproduction ==
S. krisalys is oviparous.
