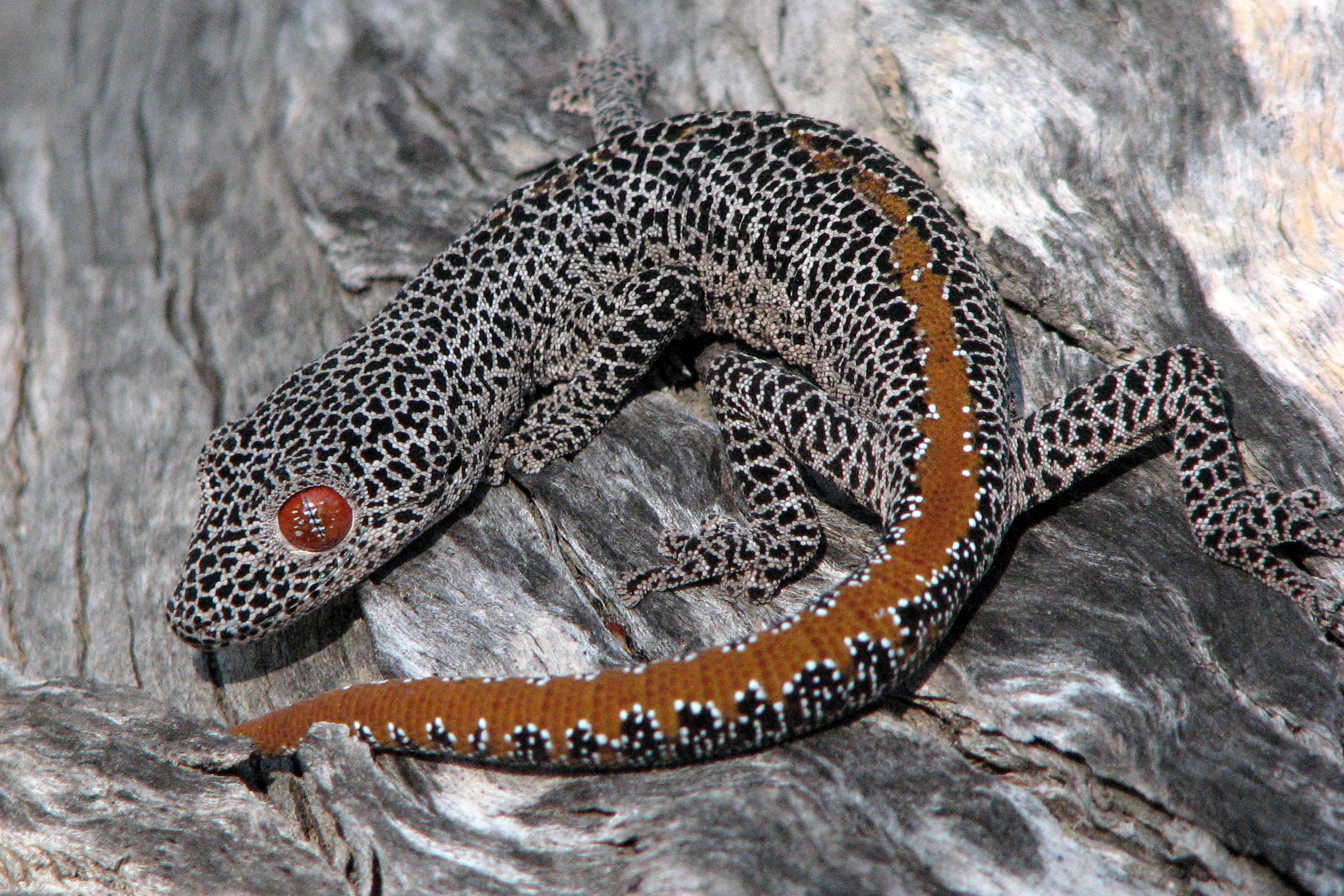
- Strophurus taenicauda

Scientific classification
- Kingdom: Animalia
- Phylum: Chordata
- Class: Reptilia
- Order: Squamata
- Suborder: Gekkota
- Family: Diplodactylidae
- Genus: Strophurus; Fitzinger, 1843

Species
- 20 recognized species, see article.

= Strophurus =

Genus of lizards

Strophurus is a genus of lizards in the family Diplodactylidae. All species of Strophurus are endemic to Australia, and are sometimes given the common names phasmid geckos, spiny-tailed geckos, and striped geckos.

== Description ==
The species of the genus Strophurus attain total lengths (including tail) of 80 to 130 mm (3.1 to 5.1 in). The scales of the body are generally small and round, sometimes interspersed with enlarged scales and soft spines.

All members of this genus have a unique defense mechanism: the ability to squirt a harmless, foul-smelling fluid from their tails, which can create a highly flammable substance when mixed with ammonia. This fluid is used to deter birds while they are perching in shrubbery, being unusual in the family by exposing themselves during the day. As with many other geckos, they are also nocturnal. Some members lack spines and enlarged scales, while another subgroup features spines on the tail and other parts of the body.

Their habitat is amongst shrubs and hummock grass, but they occasionally move to the ground for warmth or to mate. This behavior is especially prominent in pregnant females, which use the additional warmth of rocks and roads to assist the development of the two eggs they carry.

== Species ==
There are 21 known species of Strophurus, and a number of subspecies.

Image	Scientific name	Common name	Distribution
	Strophurus assimilis (Storr, 1988)	Goldfields spiny-tailed gecko	Australia
	Strophurus ciliaris (Boulenger, 1885)	Northern spiny-tailed gecko	Australia
	Strophurus congoo Vanderduys, 2016	Congoo gecko	Australia: North QLD
	Strophurus elderi (Stirling & Zietz, 1893)	Jewelled gecko	Australia
	Strophurus horneri (P. Oliver & Parkin, 2014)	Arnhem phasmid gecko	Australia
	Strophurus intermedius (Ogilby, 1892)	Eastern spiny-tailed gecko, Southern Spiny-tailed Gecko	Australia: NSW, NT, SA, Vic and WA
	Strophurus jeanae (Storr, 1988)	Southern phasmid gecko	Australia
	Strophurus krisalys (Sadlier, O'Meally, & Shea, 2005)		Australia
	Strophurus mcmillani (Storr, 1978)	McMillan's spiny-tailed gecko, short-tailed striped gecko	Australia
	Strophurus michaelseni (Werner, 1910)	Robust striped gecko	Australia
S rankini	Strophurus rankini (Storr, 1979)	Exmouth spiny-tailed gecko	Australia
	Strophurus robinsoni (L.A. Smith, 1995)		Australia
	Strophurus spinigerus (Gray, 1842)	Soft spiny-tailed gecko, south-western spiny-tailed gecko	Australia
	Strophurus spinula Sadlier, Beatson, Brennan & Bauer, 2023	Lesser thorn-tailed gecko	Australia: WA
	Strophurus strophurus (A.M.C. Duméril & Bibron, 1836)	Western spiny-tailed gecko	Australia
	Strophurus taeniatus (Lönnberg & Andersson, 1913)	Phasmid striped gecko, white-striped gecko	Australia
	Strophurus taenicauda (De Vis, 1886)	Golden spiny-tailed gecko, golden-tailed gecko	Australia
	Strophurus trux Vanderduys, 2017	Golden-eyed gecko	Australia
	Strophurus wellingtonae (Storr, 1988)	Western Shield spiny-tailed gecko, Wellington's spiny-tailed gecko	Australia
	Strophurus williamsi (Kluge, 1963)	Eastern spiny-tailed gecko, soft-spined gecko	Australia
	Strophurus wilsoni (Storr, 1983)	Mount Augustus spiny-tailed gecko, Mount Augustus striped gecko	Australia

Nota bene: A binomial authority in parentheses indicates that the species was originally described in a genus other than Strophurus.
