= Golden-eyed gecko =

Scientific classification
- Kingdom: Animalia
- Phylum: Chordata
- Class: Reptilia
- Order: Squamata
- Suborder: Gekkota
- Family: Diplodactylidae
- Genus: Strophurus
- Species: S. trux

Binomial name
- Strophurus trux Vanderduys, 2017

Species of lizard

The golden-eyed gecko (Strophurus trux) is a species of lizard in the family Diplodactylidae. The species is endemic to Australia.

== Geographic range ==
S. trux is found in central Queensland, Australia.
