= Strophurus horneri =

Conservation status
- Vulnerable (IUCN 3.1)

Scientific classification
- Kingdom: Animalia
- Phylum: Chordata
- Class: Reptilia
- Order: Squamata
- Suborder: Gekkota
- Family: Diplodactylidae
- Genus: Strophurus
- Species: S. horneri

Binomial name
- Strophurus horneri P. Oliver & Parkin, 2014

Species of lizard

Strophurus horneri, also known commonly as the Arnhem phasmid gecko, is a species of lizard in the family Diplodactylidae. The species is endemic to Australia.

== Etymology ==
The specific name, horneri, is in honour of Australian zoologist Paul Horner who is a Curator Emeritus of the Museum and Art Gallery of the Northern Territory.

== Geographic range ==
S. horneri is found in Northern Territory of northern Australia.

== Description ==
S. horneri is narrow-headed and slender-bodied. Its dorsal colouration consists of four broad yellow stripes on a brown or grayish ground colour. A small species, its snout-to-vent length is only about 3.5 cm (1.4 in).

== Habitat ==
The preferred habitat of S. horneri is grassland.
