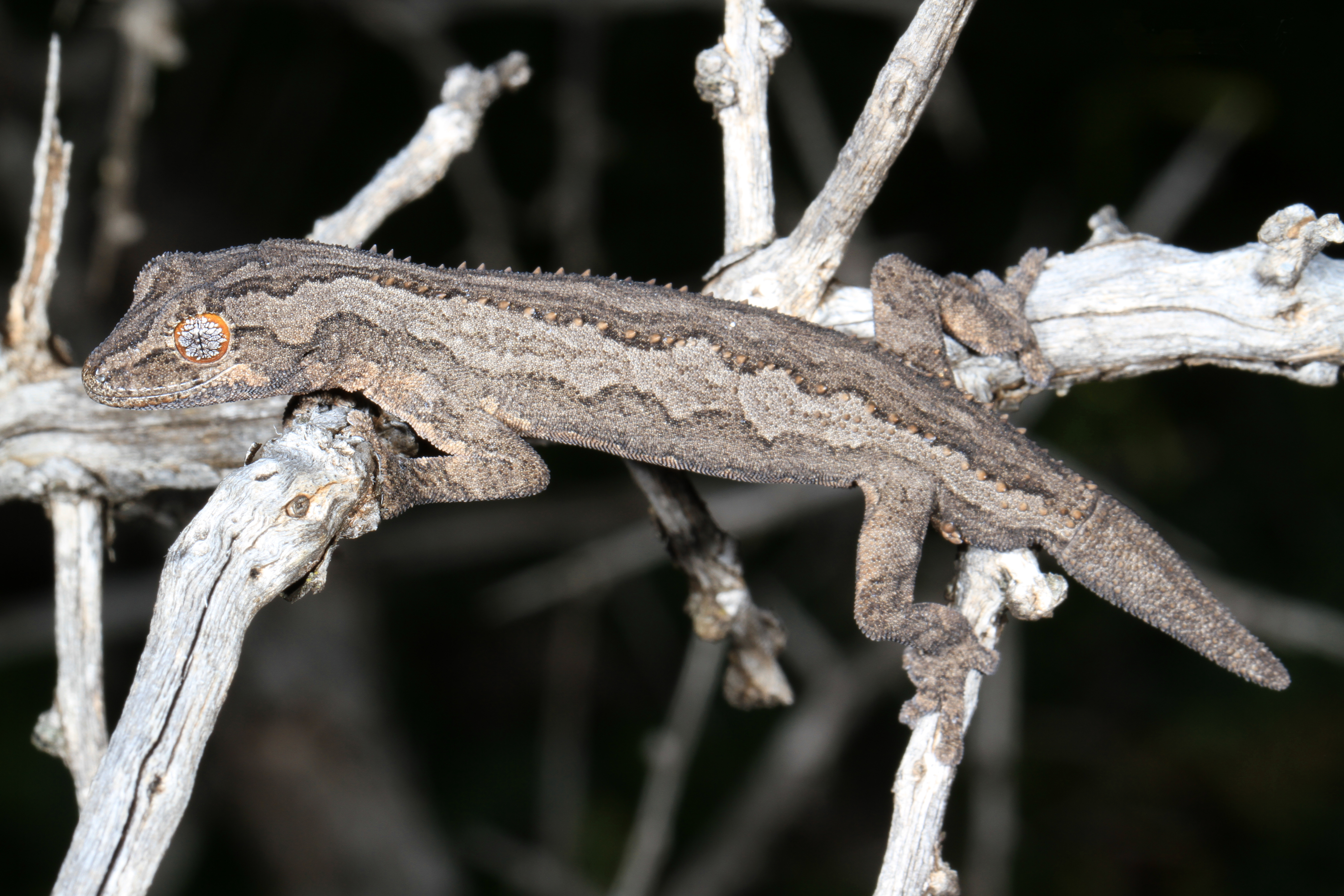

Conservation status
- Least Concern (IUCN 3.1)

Scientific classification
- Kingdom: Animalia
- Phylum: Chordata
- Class: Reptilia
- Order: Squamata
- Suborder: Gekkota
- Family: Diplodactylidae
- Genus: Strophurus
- Species: S. intermedius

Binomial name
- Strophurus intermedius (Ogilby, 1892)

Synonyms
- Diplodactylus intermedius Ogilby, 1892; Diplodactylus strophurus intermedius — Mitchell, 1955; Diplodactylus ciliaris intermedius — Kluge, 1967; Strophurus intermedius — Wells & Wellington, 1984

= Strophurus intermedius =

Species of lizard

Strophurus intermedius, also known commonly as the eastern spiny-tailed gecko or the southern spiny-tailed gecko, is a species of lizard in the family Diplodactylidae. The species is endemic to semi-arid regions of Australia in New South Wales, Northern Territory, South Australia, Victoria and Western Australia, in mallee shrubland and woodland habitats.

== Description ==
S. intermedius is one of the larger species of the geckos found in Australia. It has a grey, patterned body with a pale belly. It acquired its common names, eastern spiny-tailed gecko and southern spiny-tailed gecko, from the two longitudinal rows of prominent tubercles along the length of its back and tail. These spines are orange-brown in colour and become more prominent towards the tail. This spiny feature acts as a defence mechanism. The spines on the tail exude a harmless yet smelly, orange fluid at the attacker. Its limbs and body are strong. The tips of the digits are disced like those of most species of Gekkota. The mouth has a blue lining. The iris of the eye has a bright orange rim.

The head is oviform and convex with a rounded snout and large eyes. There are no spines over the eyes. Adults have an average snout-to-vent length (SVL) of 64 mm (2.5 in). Adults are sexually dimorphic with females being larger than males. Males also have large hemipenal bulges while females do not.

== Taxonomy and etymology ==
James Douglas Ogilby was the first to identify Strophurus intermedius in 1892, when he described it as Diplodactylus intermedius, a species new to science. The genus Strophurus (most species characterised by the spines along the back and tail) contains 20 recognised species, all of which are endemic to Australia. All of the species in this genus have the same unique defence mechanism of squirting harmless but smelly liquid from the spines of the tail. Strophurus means "turning tail" in Latin while intermedius means "intermediate".

== Geographic range ==
S. intermedius is found in the southernmost parts of the Northern Territory, Western Australia and Queensland. It is found all throughout the states of New South Wales and South Australia, and the northern half of Victoria. It is most commonly found around Alice Springs, NT.

== Ecology and habitat ==
S. intermedius is nocturnal (night active) and terrestrial (land dwelling). It is an ectotherm and is found in semi-arid, warm habitats. During the day, it will hide under rocks, bark of trees or in logs. It is also found in spinifex grass. During the night, it is active hunting for food. It is generally found in vegetation such as shrubland, woodland and grassland.

== Reproduction ==
S. intermedius is oviparous. The female will start reproducing at the age of two and will lay a clutch of two eggs during the summer. It takes about 45 days for the eggs to hatch. Females are reproductively active over a 6-month period. Both females and males will reach maturity at two years of age.

== Diet ==
The diet of S. intermedius consists exclusively of arthropods. These include species of spiders, centipedes, scorpions, cockroaches, crickets, beetles and their larvae. Its diet overlaps largely with its relative S. spinigerus by almost 90%.

== Predators and threats ==
The anti-predator liquid which S. intermedius sprays at attackers from its tail has been observed to be aimed for birds. However, the southern spiny-tailed gecko might also encounter some introduced species of predators such as feral cats. In central Australia, feral cats have been known to feed on a wide range diet, including reptiles. It seems that during the summer, feral cats frequently feed on reptiles, including geckos:.

== Conservation status ==
S. intermedius is not a threatened species. The species has been assessed as Least Concern by the IUCN Red List of Threatened Species.
