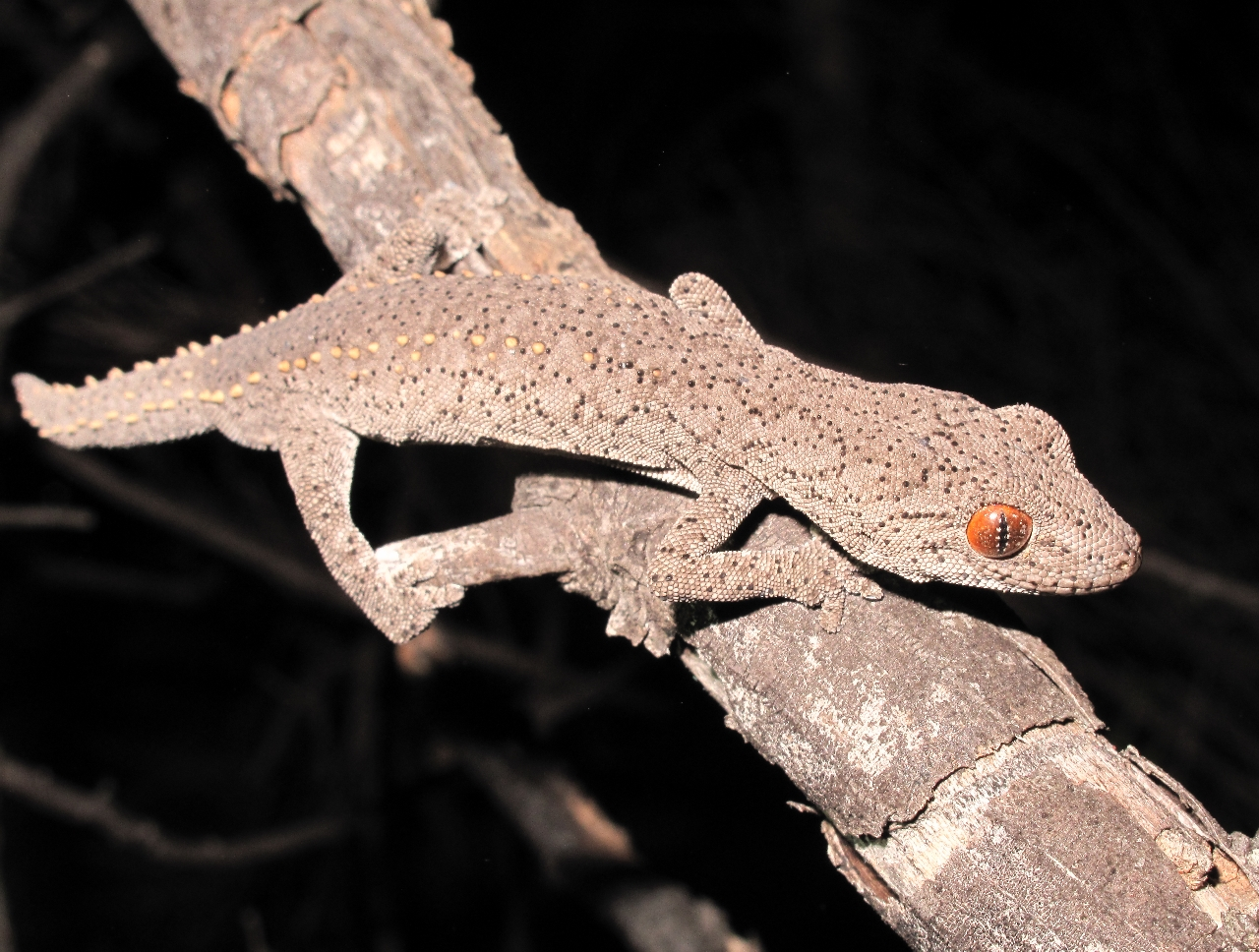
- Eastern spiny-tailed gecko in Pilliga forest, NSW, Australia

Conservation status
- Least Concern (IUCN 3.1)

Scientific classification
- Kingdom: Animalia
- Phylum: Chordata
- Class: Reptilia
- Order: Squamata
- Suborder: Gekkota
- Family: Diplodactylidae
- Genus: Strophurus
- Species: S. williamsi

Binomial name
- Strophurus williamsi (Kluge, 1963)

Synonyms
- Diplodactylus williamsi Kluge, 1963

= Strophurus williamsi =

Species of lizard

Strophurus williamsi, also known commonly as the eastern spiny-tailed gecko, the soft-spined gecko, and Williams' spiny-tailed gecko, is a species of lizard in the family Diplodactylidae. The species is endemic to semi-arid regions of eastern Australia including Queensland, New South Wales, Victoria and South Australia. It has become a popular species as a pet for its distinctive tail features. S. williamsi has been grouped within a clade of seven other species that are believed to have diverged from their ancestors around 20 million years ago. S. williamsi can be distinguished from closer relatives by arboreality (living in trees) and diurnal (day-active) activity.

== Description ==
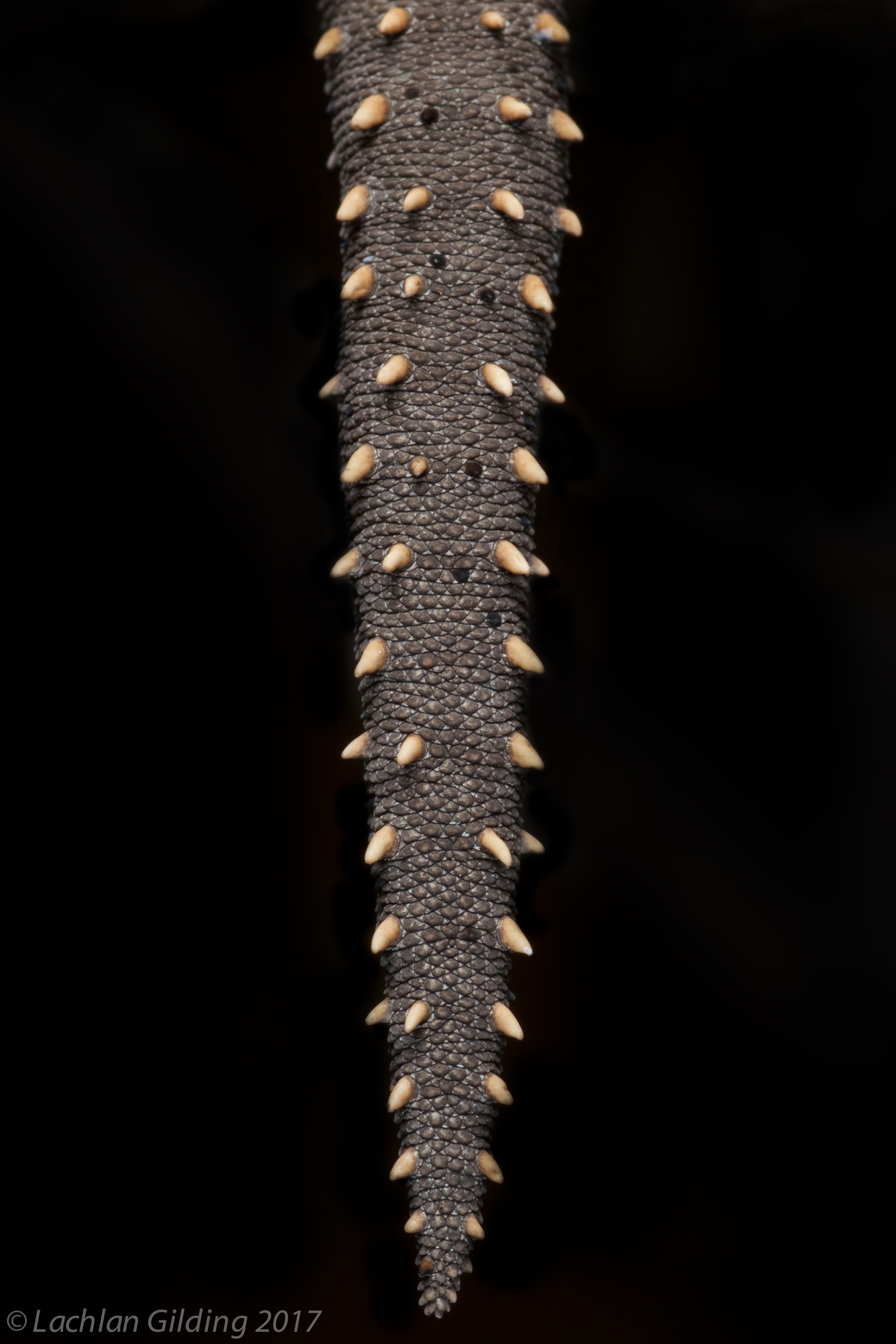
Strophurus williamsi showing longitudinal tubercles on the tail

S. williamsi is a small-sized, slender bodied gecko with a snout to vent length of 6 cm and tail length of 5 cm. Their main body colour is grey with darker brown/grey patches and spots. Some individuals may display a diamond or reticulated pattern on the dorsal surface. Ventral surfaces are pale grey or white and are dotted with brown or black spots. During the day, individuals can be found basking on thin branches relying on their camouflage colouration to protect them from predators. Their eyes have an orange to red rim around the iris. The toes are long and expanded with well-developed adhesive pads. Toe tips have large adhesive lamellae that decrease in size towards the palm.

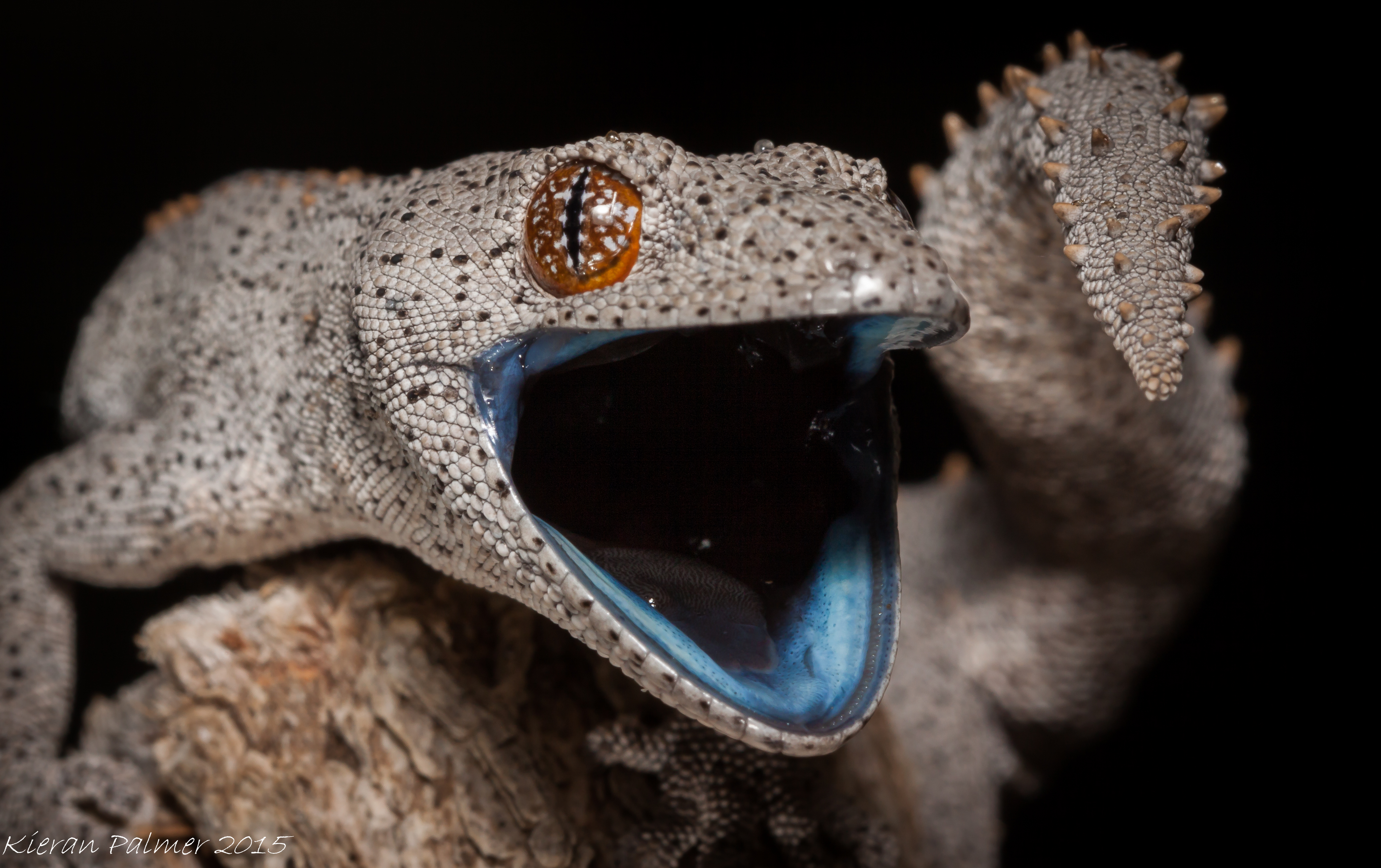
Coloured ornamentation on the mouth of Strophurus williamsi

The species can be distinguished from similar looking Strophurus from the rows of enlarged projections along the back of the tail. These projections, otherwise known as tubercles, occur in four longitudinal rows along the back of the tail and are orange in colour. Studies conducted by Eric Pianka depict that the tails of eastern spiny-tailed geckos have evolved to obtain antipredator functions and are also commonly used in behavioural displays. The caudal glands are able to project thin streams of a sticky, noxious and odorous substance through the skin ruptures of the mid-dorsal line of the tail. These defence secretions (composed of protein and glycoprotein) can be aimed at a predator by the curving of the tail. It has been found that this caudal-gland ejection (the ejection of a sticky defensive secretion from the tail) has a direct link with lower rates of tail loss in S. williamsi. This may also be due to the elaboration of tubercles surrounding the caudal glands as many other species of gecko rely solely on autotomy to escape predators.

Another antipredator function is a defensive posture that usually involves lifting and arching of the body and extending the throat while slowly waving the tail from side to side. During this display, individuals open their mouths exposing their vibrant mouth colour which is usually dark blue or bright yellow.

Males can be distinguished from females from a single diagonal row of cloacal scales. Males generally have one to five scales which are much larger and more prominent in females which have one to three. Males also possess preanal pores which are absent in females.

== Etymology ==
The specific name, williamsi, is in honour of American herpetologist Ernest Edward Williams. Their common name 'Eastern-spiny tailed gecko' directly relates to the distinctive features of 'spikes' protruding from the tail.

== Taxonomy ==
The genus Strophurus is one of only two squamate lineages that obtain specialised causal defence glands. Many species in this genus also have caudal ornamentation or bright coloured patterns on the iris, tail and the mouth. The genus currently contains 20 species which were separated from Diplodactylus which are mostly terrestrial ground-dwelling species.

== Ecology and habitat ==
There are numerous ecosystems and ecoregions which the eastern spiny-tailed gecko inhabits with different vegetation structure and composition. The preferred habitats of S. williamsi are sclerophyll forest, savanna, eucalypt woodland and eucalypt forest communities. They have also been found bordering the edge of rainforest communities that are adjacent the previously said vegetation communities. Earlier studies have shown S.williamsi is commonly found beneath the loose bark of Callitrius pine or Ironbarks and in tree hollows and tree trunks. The species is also associated with shrubs, Spinefex, Casuarina, Callitris and Leptospermum. During the night-time when the species is most active, they can be found foraging on the ground around grassy bushes. There are numerous populations of S.williamsi inhabiting savanna ecosystems without trees and therefore, the species may also occupy other niches that have not yet been studied.

== Geographic range ==
In Australia, S. williamsi is found in north-eastern New South Wales, Queensland, south-eastern South Australia, and north-western Victoria. The map below shows a patchy distribution of the species distributed throughout the east of the continent as far north as Cairs in QLD, as south as Adelaide in SA and as west as Bourke in NSW. The species can be commonly found within Murray-Darling woodlands and mallee ecoregion in Victoria. In central NSW and south-west QLD, the semi-arid biome makes up the greatest area of occupation for the species with multiple shifts into surrounding sclerophyll and monsoon communities. The preferred temperature range of the species is 25–30 °C.

== Reproduction ==
The breeding season for eastern spiny-tailed geckos is from September to February and reproduction is dioecious. S. williamsi is oviparous which is where young are produced through the expulsion of undeveloped eggs rather than giving birth to live young. Females lay two clutches of two eggs at a time which are generally laid at the base of trees, under rocks or in abandoned burrows that are no longer occupied by other animals. Eggs hatch within 45–80 days within a temperature range of 27–30 °C and optimal humidity of 70–80%. Three to five days after the hatchlings emerge from the eggs, the juvenile geckos can begin feeding. Subsequent matings can be observed as soon as one hour after the deposition of the clutch occurs. On average, females can produce five clutches per year.

== Diet ==
Eastern spiny-tailed geckos are insectivorous feeding primarily on arthropods. Their main diet consists of crickets, grasshoppers, moths, spiders and termites.

== Threats ==
Strophurus williamsi has been evaluated and categorised by the IUCN as a species of least concern meaning that they are not a focus for conservation because they are not threatened. The species is however, vulnerable to pressure by grazing and habitat loss, mostly occurring due to land clearing for agriculture. Predators of the eastern spiny-tailed gecko include feral cats, larger lizards such as goannas, birds of prey. They are also commonly preyed upon by the pale-headed snake.
