= Lerista petersoni =

Conservation status
- Least Concern (IUCN 3.1)

Scientific classification
- Kingdom: Animalia
- Phylum: Chordata
- Class: Reptilia
- Order: Squamata
- Family: Scincidae
- Genus: Lerista
- Species: L. petersoni

Binomial name
- Lerista petersoni Storr, 1976

Synonyms
- Lerista connivens petersoni Storr, 1976; Lerista nichollsi petersoni Storr, 1976; Lerista talpina Storr, 1991

Species of lizard

Lerista petersoni, also known commonly as the pale broad-blazed slider and the pale broad-striped slider, is a species of lizard in the subfamily Sphenomorphinae of the family Scincidae (skinks). The species is endemic to Australia.

== Etymology ==
The specific name, petersoni, is in honor of Australian herpetologist Magnus Peterson, who collected the holotype.

== Description ==
Adults of Lerista petersoni usually have a snout-to-vent length (SVL) of about 7 cm (2.8 in). The front legs are absent, and each back leg has two digits. The transparent lower eyelid is immovable (fused). There are four supraciliary scales.

== Geographic distribution ==
Lerista petersoni is found in the Australian state of Western Australia.

== Habitat ==
The preferred natural habitat of Lerista petersoni is shrubland.

== Behavior ==
Lerista petersoni is terrestrial and fossorial, burrowing under leaf litter.

== Reproduction ==
Lerista petersoni is oviparous.
