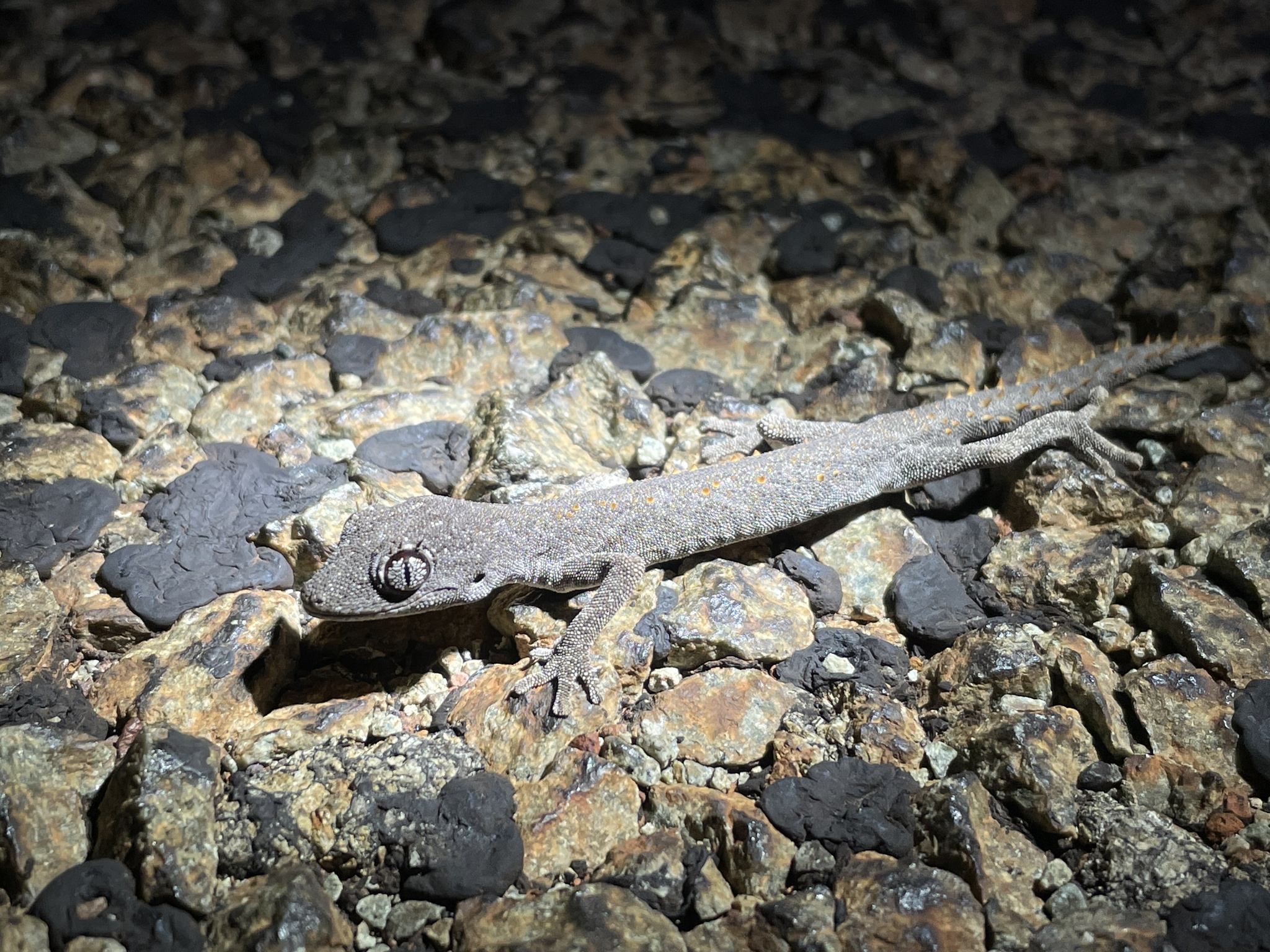

Conservation status
- Least Concern (IUCN 3.1)

Scientific classification
- Kingdom: Animalia
- Phylum: Chordata
- Class: Reptilia
- Order: Squamata
- Suborder: Gekkota
- Family: Diplodactylidae
- Genus: Strophurus
- Species: S. wellingtonae

Binomial name
- Strophurus wellingtonae (Storr, 1988)

Synonyms
- Diplodactylus wellingtonae Storr, 1988; Strophurus wellingtonae — Greer, 1989

= Western Shield spiny-tailed gecko =

Species of lizard

The Western Shield spiny-tailed gecko (Strophurus wellingtonae), also known commonly as Wellington's spiny-tailed gecko, is a species of lizard in the family Diplodactylidae. The species is endemic to Australia.

== Etymology ==
The specific name, wellingtonae (genitive, feminine, singular), is in honor of Betty D. Wellington of Mount Helena, Western Australia.

== Geographic range ==
S. wellingtonae is found in western Western Australia.

== Habitat ==
The preferred habitats of S. wellingtonae are grassland and savanna.

== Description ==
A large species for its genus, S. wellingtonae may attain a snout-to-vent length (SVL) of 8.5 cm (3.3 in), and a total length (including a long tail) of 14.5 cm (5.7 in).

== Reproduction ==
S. wellingtonae is oviparous.
