= Wells and Wellington affair =

1980s publication of three articles and its aftermath

The Wells and Wellington affair was a dispute about the publication of three papers in the Australian Journal of Herpetology in 1983 and 1985. The periodical was established in 1981 as a peer-reviewed scientific journal focusing on the study of amphibians and reptiles (herpetology). Its first two issues were published under the editorship of Richard W. Wells, a first-year biology student at Australia's University of New England. Wells then ceased communicating with the journal's editorial board for two years before suddenly publishing three papers without peer review in the journal in 1983 and 1985. Coauthored by himself and high school teacher Cliff Ross Wellington, the papers reorganized the taxonomy of all of Australia's and New Zealand's amphibians and reptiles and proposed over 700 changes to the binomial nomenclature of the region's herpetofauna.

Members of the herpetological community reacted strongly to the pair's actions and eventually brought a case to the International Commission on Zoological Nomenclature to suppress the scientific names they had proposed. After four years of arguments, the commission opted not to vote on the case because it hinged largely on taxonomic arguments rather than nomenclatural ones, leaving some of Wells and Wellington's names available. The case's outcome highlighted the vulnerability to the established rules of biological nomenclature that desktop publishing presented. As of 2020, 24 of the specific names assigned by Wells and Wellington remained valid senior synonyms.

== Background and publication ==
=== Australian Journal of Herpetology ===
Australian Journal of Herpetology
- Cover of issue one
- Discipline: Herpetology
- Peer-reviewed: Issues 1–2: yes; Issues 3–4 and supplemental series: no
- Language: English
- Edited by: Richard W. Wells

Publication details
- History: 1981–1985
- Publisher: Australian Herpetologists' League (issues 1–2); Australian Biological Services (issues 3–4 and supplemental series); (Australia)

Standard abbreviations
- ISO 4: Aust. J. Herpetol.

Indexing
- ISSN: 0728-4683
- OCLC no.: 1125293756

The Australian Journal of Herpetology was a scientific journal specialising in herpetology. Its publisher, the Sydney-based Australian Herpetologists' League, was established to facilitate the journal's production. The journal's editorial board consisted of three Australian researchers: Harold Heatwole, an associate professor at the University of New England (UNE) in Armidale, New South Wales, Jeffrey Miller, also of UNE, and Max King of the Australian National University. Richard W. Wells, a first-year student pursuing a Bachelor of Science degree in biology at UNE who had previously collected zoological specimens for several Australian museums, served as the journal's editor. Its editorial board refereed submitted manuscripts and, once accepted, sent them to Wells for publication. Because of Wells's enrolment at UNE, the Australian Journal of Herpetology was able to use a mailing address at the university.

In 1981, the Australian Herpetologists' League published the first and second issues of the first volume of the Australian Journal of Herpetology. They contained papers written both by professional and amateur researchers concerning a number of topics in Australian herpetology, including a description of a novel python species, "Python" bredli. The journal gained individual and institutional subscribers in Australia and abroad. Meanwhile, Wells did not complete his first year at UNE and moved to Sydney.

=== Wells and Wellington's papers ===
For two years, the journal did not release any further issues. During this time, the editorial board continued to forward accepted manuscripts to Wells, who maintained his UNE address despite having left Armidale. Then, without the board's knowledge, a 56-page double issue consisting of a single article, "A Synopsis of the Class Reptilia in Australia" by Wells and Cliff Ross Wellington was published dated 31 December 1983. (Note: Although dated for the end of 1983, the work is usually cited as "Wells & Wellington, 1984", including by the authors themselves in subsequent works.) The paper reassessed the taxonomy of Australia's entire reptile class; in doing so, the pair named 33 novel genera and raised eight further genera from synonym status and established 214 additional species, either by elevating subspecies or resurrecting synonyms. The herpetologist Michael J. Tyler described the paper as including "more taxonomic changes [to Australia's herpetofauna] than had been proposed by all other authors in the previous decade". This issue of the journal listed Wells as the managing editor and Wellington as the advertising sales manager, a change from its prior two issues. Further, the journal stated that copyright was now held by Australian Biological Services, an entity which listed Wells's address for contact and payment.

A single-issue supplemental series to the Australian Journal of Herpetology was released in 1985, dated 1 March. At first, only spiralbound printouts of the issue were reported as being available although in September 1985, several professionally printed copies were distributed in Brisbane, effectively rendering the publication date 30 September 1985. The issue contained two articles, both again coauthored by Wells and Wellington. The first, "A Classification of the Amphibia and Reptilia of Australia", reassessed Australia's amphibians, naming at least 57 novel genera, resurrecting nine more from synonym status, naming 146 novel species, and resurrecting 110 from synonym status. The second, "A Synopsis of the Amphibia and Reptilia of New Zealand", offered a similar treatment to New Zealand's amphibian and reptile classes, naming four novel genera and elevating or describing six new species. Among other references, "A Classification of the Amphibia and Reptilia of Australia" cited over 500 alleged papers, some ostensibly nearly 100 pages long, written primarily by Wells in 1983 and 1984 in the unknown journal Australian Herpetologist. Neither Australian Herpetologist nor the hundreds of papers purportedly published therein were reported as having been available at any major Australian libraries or listed in the Australian Bibliographic Network as of 1985. The first article also referred to several specimens housed in the "Australian Zoological Museum" which was Wells's private collection.

== Rationales and responses ==
=== Initial reactions ===
Upon the release of "A Synopsis of the Class Reptilia in Australia", all three members of the Australian Journal of Herpetology's editorial board resigned. The trio wrote letters to the editor of the Herpetological Review, a journal published by the international Society for the Study of Amphibians and Reptiles, to clarify that the Australian Journal of Herpetology was not affiliated with UNE past its second issue and that Wells and Wellington's papers had been self-published and had not undergone peer review. Heatwole also encouraged authors whose papers had been accepted for future issues to send their work elsewhere, as Wells was unresponsive to calls to return their manuscripts to them.

British paleontologist Tony Thulborn described reactions from professional herpetologists to the pair's actions as ranging "from disbelief to outrage". News of "A Synopsis of the Class Reptilia in Australia" and the fallout of its publication was reported throughout 1984 in several New South Wales newspapers, including the Illawarra Mercury, the Blue Mountains Gazette and The Sydney Morning Herald. The latter wrote that the events were "one of the most interesting scientific bun-fights in Australia's history".

Wells and Wellington's combined work put forth more than 700 changes to the binomial nomenclature of Australia's reptiles and amphibians, until this point believed to include around 900 species. Herpetologists asserted that the duo had described species without providing adequate diagnostic characteristics and established new taxa without identifying or examining type species. G. B. Monteith contended that the pair had named numerous species in trivial ways (including, for instance, naming a genus after Darth Vader), and wrote that although Wells and Wellington had given some taxa names honouring working herpetologists, many of those namesakes supported suppressing the duo's work. Gordon C. Grigg, president of the Australian Society of Herpetologists, and the evolutionary biologist and ecologist Richard Shine wrote in a letter to the Herpetological Review that "the effect of these [Wells and Wellington's] publications, if taken seriously, would be to destabilise permanently the nomenclature of the Australian herpetofauna." The letter was cosigned by over 150 other herpetologists. In September 1984, the Australian Society of Herpetologists elected to petition the International Commission on Zoological Nomenclature (ICZN) to suppress all of the names proposed in the first of the pair's three papers, the only one published at that point.

Word spread outside the world of herpetology in 1985 when Monteith, an entomologist, reported on the affair in the Australian Entomological Society News Bulletin. Monteith's article, "Terrorist Tactics in Taxonomy", was subsequently republished in newsletters covering other fields of taxonomic study. The botanist Jan Frederik Veldkamp remarked that "this all may seem to be very funny, and it's happening to zoologists, anyway, but there is no reason to be so smug about this", continuing that plant nomenclature as governed by the International Code of Botanical Nomenclature could be similarly susceptible to destabilization. In 1986, Thulborn reported on the situation in the international journal Nature.

=== Wells and Wellington's justifications ===
Wells and Wellington, the latter a teacher at Blaxland High School, said that they did "years of research" before publishing their first paper. Wellington claimed in 1984 that their work was self-published due to a dispute with the Australian Museum, to which the pair had donated several specimens. Nonetheless, he said that the museum had prevented him and Wells from using its reptile collections for their research, further saying that,

"It became obvious to us that there were people in the know who were keeping a lot of things to themselves [...] Our studies showed that there were many animals which were very distinctive and should have full specific status. Because some scientists were suppressing this for their own ends, these animals were suffering. How can you talk about conserving animals when you don't even know they exist?"

Relative to other continents, Australia's herpetofauna had been subject to less in-depth research, primarily due to the continent's low population density, uneven population distribution, and high biodiversity. Monteith described the duo's justification for their papers as "a radical conservation ethic" and wrote that their intent appeared to be based on the belief that describing individual populations as distinct species would hasten efforts for their conservation. Wells and Wellington said in the introduction to their first paper that they hoped their work would be taken "not as anarchistic taxonomic vandalism, but as a decisive step intended to stir others into action". They intended to encourage others to generate research either to ratify their conclusions or counter them, either way putting out material to further understanding of reptile and amphibian life in the region.

=== ICZN case 2531 ===
Binomial nomenclature, the widely used system of identifying distinct species through two-part Latin names, is related to and distinct from the study of taxonomy, the description and arrangement of these different taxa in relationship to one another. Changes to taxonomy, whether subject to peer review or not, are regarded as reliant on the discretion of subsequent researchers who may choose to incorporate them into or ignore them in future works on the basis of their scientific rigour and the evidence provided. Changes to zoological nomenclature, meanwhile, are governed by the ICZN's International Code of Zoological Nomenclature (the Code), of which a key component is the Principle of Priority: that "the valid name of a taxon is the oldest available name applied to it". (Note: An available name is one which has not been explicitly suppressed by the ICZN and otherwise fulfils the requirements of the Code.) Thus the publication of a new name, so long as it complies with Code requirements but regardless of the quality of the source in which it appears, establishes it as a name of record.

The ICZN published Grigg's case for suppressing the names provided in "A Synopsis of the Class Reptilia in Australia", "A Classification of the Amphibia and Reptilia of Australia" and "A Synopsis of the Amphibia and Reptilia of New Zealand" in the June 1987 issue of their journal, the Bulletin of Zoological Nomenclature. Case 2531 received "strong arguments" from at least 91 writers and was retrospectively characterised by the herpetologists David Williams, Wolfgang Wüster and Bryan Grieg Fry by "the usual professional decorum being notable by its absence in some of the attacks upon Wells and Wellington".

In the initial case to suppress the names, Grigg described several specific issues with the Wells and Wellington works. He wrote that their claim that they examined almost 40,000 specimens (translating to more than ten each day every day for ten years) was unlikely. According to Grigg, the duo had taken 205 subspecies or synonyms directly from a 1983 book by Harold Cogger and colleagues and had elevated or resurrected them to species status with no further discussion. He added that while Wells and Wellington had claimed to have visited several museums outside Australia to examine specimens in their collections, these museums confirmed with him that they had not lent or shown specimens to either Wellington or Wells. Grigg wrote that while many taxonomists would likely reject the nomenclature contained in the three papers because of the quality of the underlying taxonomy, non-taxonomists unaware of the situation surrounding the works might accept the nomenclature, leading to nomenclatural destabilization. This outcome, Grigg speculated, would require piecemeal acceptance or refutation of all of the hundreds of changes offered by the pair in their papers.

The researcher Glenn M. Shea wrote that the names in "A Synopsis of the Class Reptilia in Australia", even those accompanied by "inadequate or erroneous" diagnoses, fulfilled the requirements of the Code and were thus available. However, Shea listed 43 species from "A Classification of the Amphibia and Reptilia of Australia" whose diagnoses did not differentiate them from the populations from which the pair was attempting to split them, and also identified three species whose diagnoses were reliant on works that were still in press at the time of Shea's comment (late 1987). Shea identified several proposed species whose holotypes were collected from outside the species' proposed ranges and several well-known populations of species that were suddenly without names based on Wells and Wellington's diagnoses.

The researcher Jonathon Stone wrote that the ICZN permitting Wells and Wellington's names would set a negative precedent for subsequent researchers to enact nomenclatural changes without peer review. Several researchers rejected the argument that suppressing the pair's names was an act of censorship. The Australian Museum's Allan E. Greer rejected calls to suppress the names, noting that the Australian Museum, Cogger, Shea and others had already (by 1988) used some of the nomenclature in subsequent research. The taxonomist and nomenclaturist Alain Dubois and colleagues at the French National Museum of Natural History argued that the names should not be suppressed because it was not within the ICZN's purview or power to make taxonomic (versus nomenclatural) judgements; this sentiment was shared by a number of other authors. They wrote that many of Wells and Wellington's names could be rendered synonymous or unavailable through other means: proposed taxonomic changes like elevating subspecies to species were likely to be rejected by the world zoological community (rendering the names moot) and taxa lacking descriptions would automatically be considered nomina nuda per the provisions of the Code. However, Dubois and colleagues proposed that in some cases it might be advantageous for the ICZN to consider suppressing individual names on a case-by-case basis.

In 1989, the researcher Kraig Adler published the book Contributions to the History of Herpetology. Its index of herpetologists by John S. Applegarth intentionally omitted Wells and Wellington on the basis that their works were "inconsistent with acceptable practices of taxonomy". Philippe Bouchet and colleagues at the French National Museum of Natural History described Applegarth's attitude as akin to "the Stalinist falsification of history" and by extension, asked facetiously if the pair "should be physically eliminated using an ice-pick".

The ICZN decided the case in September 1991. The commission wrote that while Wells and Wellington had ignored many of the Code's ethical tenets and while taxonomic arguments against the pair's works were strong, the ICZN did not have the power to rule on the case on those grounds and thus opted not to vote on the case, thereby closing it. The immediate result of the ICZN opting not to vote on their case was to leave researchers of Australian herpetofauna with "a certain amount of detective work to determine which Wells and Wellington names are available, and for what species". Shea and fellow researcher Ross A. Sadlier synonymised around 60 of the duo's proposed species in a 1999 paper. The authorship of, means of publication of, and backlash to the final three Australian Journal of Herpetology articles are sometimes referred to collectively as the "Wells and Wellington affair".

== Legacy ==
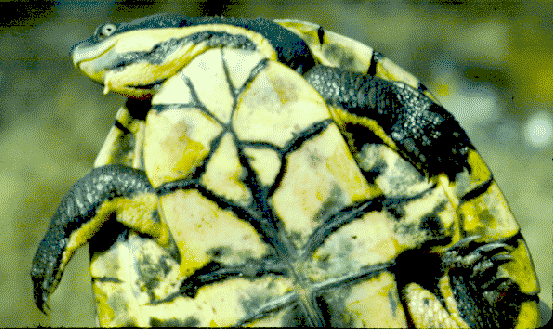
Wells and Wellington's specific name for the Manning River snapping turtle (purvisi) is recognised as the senior synonym.

In 2001, the American herpetologist John Iverson, and the Australian herpetologists Scott Thomson and Arthur Georges evaluated the changes proposed by Wells and Wellington to Australian turtles and found that just three of them represented available names. In 2017, the Turtle Taxonomy Working Group recognised one subgeneric, one specific, and one subspecific name originally proposed by the duo as being valid senior synonyms among the world's turtle taxa. A 2020 update of the Reptile Database indicated that 23 specific names for reptiles first published in the Australian Journal of Herpetology papers were recognised as valid senior synonyms at the time: sixteen lizards (including three geckos), six snakes and one turtle. (Note: Species include Acanthophis hawkei, Amphibolurus burnsi, Bellatorias obiri, Cacophis churchilli, Concinnia martini, Cryptophis incredibilis, Cyclodomorphus michaeli, Cyrtodactylus sadleiri, Demansia flagellatio, Egernia mcpheei, Egernia roomi, Eulamprus heatwolei, Eulamprus leuraensis, Gehyra lazelli, Myuchelys purvisi, Oligosoma newmani, Oligosoma robinsoni, Pogona henrylawsoni, Pseudonaja mengdeni, Rhynchoedura ormsbyi, Saltuarius swaini, Saproscincus rosei, and Varanus keithhornei.) One amphibian, the northern corroboree frog (Pseudophryne pengilleyi), also retains a specific name assigned by the pair. Additionally, several generic names proposed by Wells and Wellington have been accepted and used by subsequent researchers. (Note: Genera cited by Kaiser et al. (2020) that "have subsequently become accepted and are uncontroversially used" include Acritoscincus, Amalosia, Anepischetosia, Antaioserpens, Antaresia, Christinus, Coeranoscincus, Glaphyromorphus, Gnypetoscincus, Gowidon, Intellagama, Liburnascincus, Macrochelodina, Rankinia, Saproscincus, and Techmarscincus.)

Although Wells and Wellington indicated that they intended to write reassessments of fish in Australia, reptiles in Papua New Guinea and global herpetological taxa similar to their three papers in the Australian Journal of Herpetology, Wells withdrew somewhat from the world of academic herpetology after the affair. He and Wellington republished several of their Australian Journal of Herpetology descriptions, some with slight changes, in the following decades. The first instance of this was apparently in the Australian Herpetologist in the late 1980s; Wells alone published other taxonomic works in the vanity journal Australian Biodiversity Record in the 2000s. In 1997, Robert Sprackland, Hobart Muir Smith, and Peter Strimple initiated another case with the ICZN (number 3043) to suppress a specific name (Varanus keithhornei) published by Wells and Wellington in 1985 in favour of a name proposed in 1991 by Sprackland, who had not seen the pair's 1985 description. Suppression was widely opposed and the ICZN decided in 2001 to conserve Wells and Wellington's name as the senior synonym. Both Wellington and Wells have occasionally weighed in on other ICZN cases or defended names from their Australian Journal of Herpetology papers as senior synonyms.

In its 1991 case decision, the ICZN noted that the affair highlighted the need to update its Code to account for the effects that desktop publishing was having and would continue to have on the availability of scientific names. Nonetheless, 25 years after the affair, the herpetologists Van Wallach, Wolfgang Wüster and Donald G. Broadley wrote that "taxonomy remains as vulnerable to acts of nomenclatural vandalism as it was then". Indeed, the term "taxonomic vandalism", coined in the introduction to the pair's 1983 paper, has come be the most widely used term to describe the act of publishing low-evidence taxonomy for the purpose of proposing many new scientific names without peer review. Wells and Wellington's case was cited during a different ICZN case initiated nearly three decades later, concerning the taxonomic work of another amateur Australian herpetologist, Raymond Hoser. Hoser, who writes about Australian herpetofauna in the self-published Australasian Journal of Herpetology, gave the Pilbara death adder its scientific name (Acanthophis wellsi) in honour of Wells.

== See also ==
- Journal hijacking
