= Richard W. Wells =

Australian herpetologist

- Born: Richard Walter Wells
- Occupation: Herpetologist
- Years active: 1980s–2000s
- Known for: Australian Journal of Herpetology, Australian Biodiversity Record

Richard Walter Wells is an Australian herpetologist. He is known for editing the Australian Journal of Herpetology in the 1980s, in which he and C. Ross Wellington wrote and published three papers without academic peer review that proposed significant changes to the taxonomy and nomenclature of Australian reptiles and amphibians. In the 2000s, Wells self-published herpetological research in the Australian Biodiversity Record. The scientific names he proposed therein are the subject of a boycott begun in 2013 by some members of the herpetological community.

== Early life ==
Richard Walter Wells was interested in herpetology in his early teen years when he lived in Prospect, New South Wales. In 1980, he brought several eastern brown snake (Pseudonaja textilis) eggs to the offices of The Sydney Morning Herald, where they hatched, an occurrence which Wells stated had never before been captured on film.

== Career ==
By 1981, after working as a zoological specimen collector with several Australian museums, Wells had enrolled at the University of New England (UNE) in Armidale where he was pursuing a Bachelor of Science in biology. Wells became a member of the Australian Herpetologists' League (AHL) at UNE and during his first year at the university, became editor-in-chief of the Australian Journal of Herpetology, a new scientific journal published by the AHL. While the journal released its first two issues, Wells did not complete his first year at UNE and moved to Sydney. Nonetheless, Wells maintained a mailing address at the university and his editorship with the Australian Journal of Herpetology, although he ceased communicating with its editorial board for two years.

In a move that made him "notorious in the world of Australian herpetology", Wells unexpectedly published three papers (Note: The three papers were: Wells, R. W.; Wellington, C. R. (December 1983). "A synopsis of the class Reptilia in Australia". Australian Journal of Herpetology. 1 (3–4): 73–129.; Wells, R. W.; Wellington, C. R. (March 1985). "A classification of the Amphibia and Reptilia of Australia" (PDF). Australian Journal of Herpetology, Supplemental Series. 1: 1–61.; Wells, R. W.; Wellington, C. R. (March 1985). "A synopsis of the Amphibia and Reptilia of New Zealand" (PDF). Australian Journal of Herpetology, Supplemental Series. 1: 62–64.) in the Australian Journal of Herpetology in 1983 and 1985. Coauthored by himself and high school teacher C. Ross Wellington, the papers (which had not undergone academic peer review) significantly reorganized the taxonomy and nomenclature, proposing over 700 nomenclatural changes between them. The issues of the Australian Journal of Herpetology in which Wells had published these three papers also indicated that the copyright holder was no longer the AHL but Australian Biological Services, an entity which shared Wells' address for payment and contact. Members of Australia's herpetological community appealed to the International Commission on Zoological Nomenclature (ICZN) to suppress the binomial names proposed by the pair, but the commission found in 1991 that it did not have the authority to rule on the issue, leaving many of Wells and Wellington's names available.

The controversy became known as the Wells and Wellington affair. Wells ceased publishing academic herpetology for several years after the affair. In 1993, he was involved in the founding of the Hawkesbury Herpetological Society, a primarily electronic herpetology club.

In the 2000s, Wells self-published several papers in the Australian Biodiversity Record describing 36 novel taxa; these drew protests in the Herpetological Review from scientists who indicated they would not use any of the names Wells had proposed after 1999. The objection to Wells' names was linked to similar concerns with the taxonomy proposed by fellow Australian Raymond Hoser, who had self-published numerous nomenclature changes in his own periodical. As of 2017, the status of the names Wells had proposed in the Australian Biodiversity Record remained unclear, because no formal complaint to suppress or preserve the names had been submitted to or voted on by the ICZN. Some species identified by Wells were later validated by other researchers, yet Wells' names were ignored in protest. Without an ICZN ruling on whether Wells' names proposed in the Australian Biodiversity Record are valid senior synonyms, "there continues to be a significant dual nomenclature being created [...] to confuse not only herpetologists but also agencies or governments needing to cite the names in regulatory or conservation legislation, and in other scientific disciplines such as medicine."

== Legacy ==
Raymond Hoser bestowed the specific name Acanthophis wellsi on the Pilbara death adder, in honour of Wells and his taxonomic contributions.
