= Common dwarf skink =

There are two species of skink named common dwarf skink:

- Menetia greyii, endemic to Australia and Indonesia
- Menetia amaura, native to Western Australia
