= Pilbara ground gecko =

There are two species of gecko named Pilbara ground gecko:

- Lucasium woodwardi
- Lucasium wombeyi
