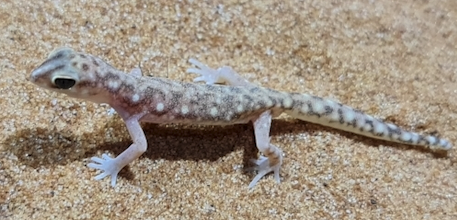

Conservation status
- Least Concern (IUCN 3.1)

Scientific classification
- Kingdom: Animalia
- Phylum: Chordata
- Class: Reptilia
- Order: Squamata
- Suborder: Gekkota
- Family: Diplodactylidae
- Genus: Rhynchoedura
- Species: R. eyrensis

Binomial name
- Rhynchoedura eyrensis Pepper, Doughty, Hutchinson, & Keough, 2011
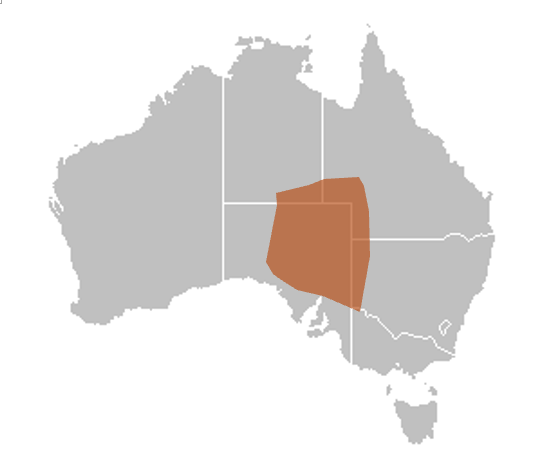
- Distribution range of the Eyre Basin beaked gecko

= Eyre Basin beaked gecko =

Species of lizard

The Eyre Basin beaked gecko (Rhynchoedura eyrensis) is a gecko endemic to Australia in the family Diplodactylidae. It is found throughout parts of South Australia, Queensland and the Northern Territory and New South Wales.

The etymology of the species eyrensis refers to the distributional area of this species across the Lake Eyre Basin in central/southern Australia.

Rhynchoedura species are widespread and occupy a range of dry woodland, shrubland, grassland, and desert environments. They are not considered to be at risk of extinction according to the International Union for Conservation of Nature (IUCN).

== Description ==
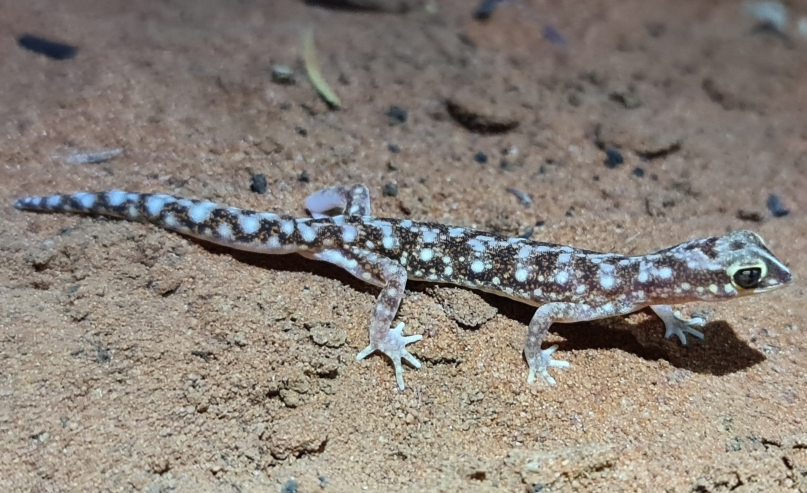
Eyre Basin Beaked Gecko (Rhynchoedura eyrensis)

The Eyre Basin beaked gecko is a small, lightly built gecko with a long, slender tail. They grow to around 51mm in length from snout to vent and is similar in appearance to the Western beaked gecko (Rhynchoedura ornata) but has a smaller body size and tends to have shorter arms and legs in comparison to its body. It has a narrow and pointed shaped head and at the tip of the snout the rostral (upper) and mental (lower) scales are enlarged and form a beak-like structure.

Their dorsal pattern is typically reddish brown to red above, specked with darker brown and with a diffuse pale vertebral zone with wavy edges and is highly variable. The head is more pale with faint pale spots, poorly defined dark canthal stripe, eyes rimmed with yellow and a white or cream stripe along the upper labials to below the eye. The tail has is also a reddish brown with two rows of spots along the upper surface that are roughly continuous with those on the body.

It can be distinguished from most other species of the Rhynchoedura genus by the combination of two pre-anal pores; a single cloacal spur (post-anal tubercle) on each side; chin with a cluster of five enlarged scales, mental, first infralabial and postmental scales; a strong rostral groove; and distribution of the species.

== Taxonomy ==
In 1867 when Albert Günther named the Rhynchoedura ornata (Western beaked gecko) the Rhynchoedura genus was considered to be a monotypic taxon. In 1985, a second species was described (Rhynchoedura ormsbyi) and in 2011, Pepper, Doughty, Hutchinson and Keogh conducted extensive examinations and revisions, sampling the population across Australia. They found previously overlooked genetic diversity in the genus and named four new cryptic species, including the Rhynchoedura eyrensis.

Due to the highly derived ‘beaked’ morphology, all Rhynchoedura specimens were assigned to the species Rhynchoedura ornata with no mention of morphological variation in scientific publications or field guides based on examination of specimens.

There are a total of six known species within the Rhynchoedura genus, commonly known as the beaked geckos. There are some notable differences in morphology between the species particularly noting consistent differences in size but also for qualitative differences in scalation and colouration.

== Distribution ==
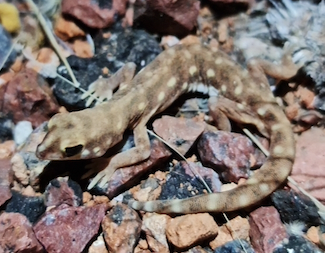
The Eyre Basin Beaked Gecko concealed amongst rocks in South Australia

The Eyre Basin beaked gecko (Rhynchoedura eyrensis) is distributed from the Eyre Peninsula in eastern South Australia, through the Lake Eyre Basin, stretching north-east to south-western Queensland, south-eastern Northern Territory and a small part of north-western New South Wales.

This region includes the Simpson Desert, Strzelecki Desert, Sturt Stony Desert and the Channel Country.

== Ecology and Habitat ==
The Eyre Basin beaked gecko (Rhynchoedura eyrensis) is a terrestrial, nocturnal, ground dwelling gecko that lives beneath ground litter and in abandoned insect and spider burrows. They utilise terrestrial cover and inhabit a variety of soil types within the eastern arid zone, including floodplains and shrublands on sandy and stony desert soils and terrain.

Their nocturnal nature provides otherwise fragile geckos, with their large eyes and soft skin, a means of being active and common in an area where during the day, they would not survive. They make use of the insulating properties of the sand, where stable humid conditions persist just beneath the surface and most have commandeered the vertical shafts of insect and spider holes to endure the scorching days.
