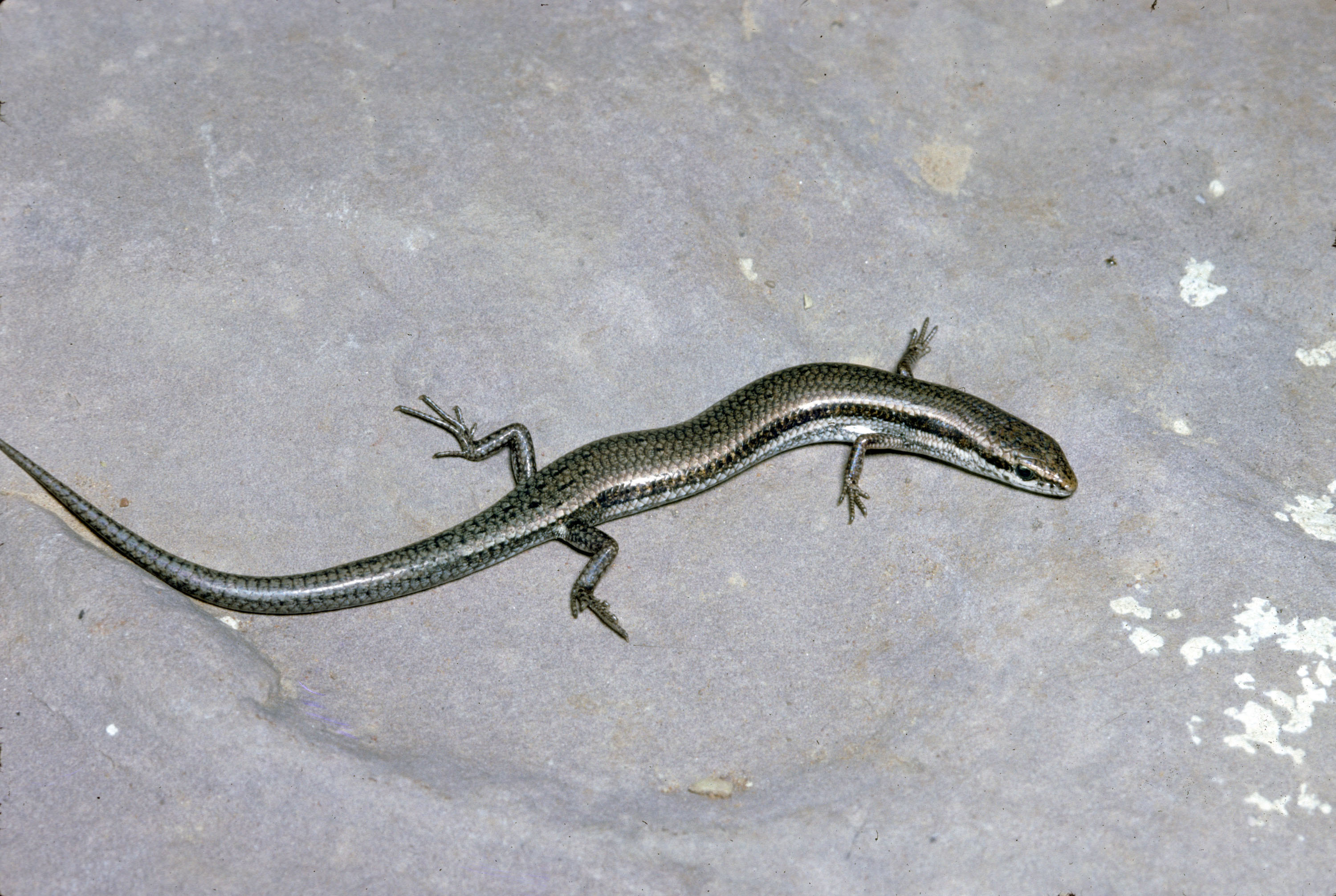
- Menetia greyii

Scientific classification
- Kingdom: Animalia
- Phylum: Chordata
- Class: Reptilia
- Order: Squamata
- Family: Scincidae
- Subfamily: Eugongylinae
- Genus: Menetia; Gray, 1845

= Menetia =

Genus of lizards

Menetia is a genus of skinks endemic to Australia. They are ground-dwellers and live in open forests and open grasslands.

== Species ==
The following six species are recognized as being valid.

- Menetia alanae Rankin, 1979 – Alana's menetia, Top End dwarf skink
- Menetia amaura Storr, 1978 – common dwarf skink
- Menetia concinna Sadlier, 1984 – Jabiluka dwarf skink
- Menetia greyii Gray, 1845 – common dwarf skink, Grey's menetia
- Menetia maini Storr, 1976 – Main's menetia, Main's dwarf skink, northern dwarf skink
- Menetia surda Storr, 1976 – western dwarf skink
