= Northern dwarf skink =

There are two species of skink named Northern dwarf skink:

- Menetia maini, found in Northern Territory, Queensland, and Western Australia
- Nannoscincus exos, found in New Caledonia
