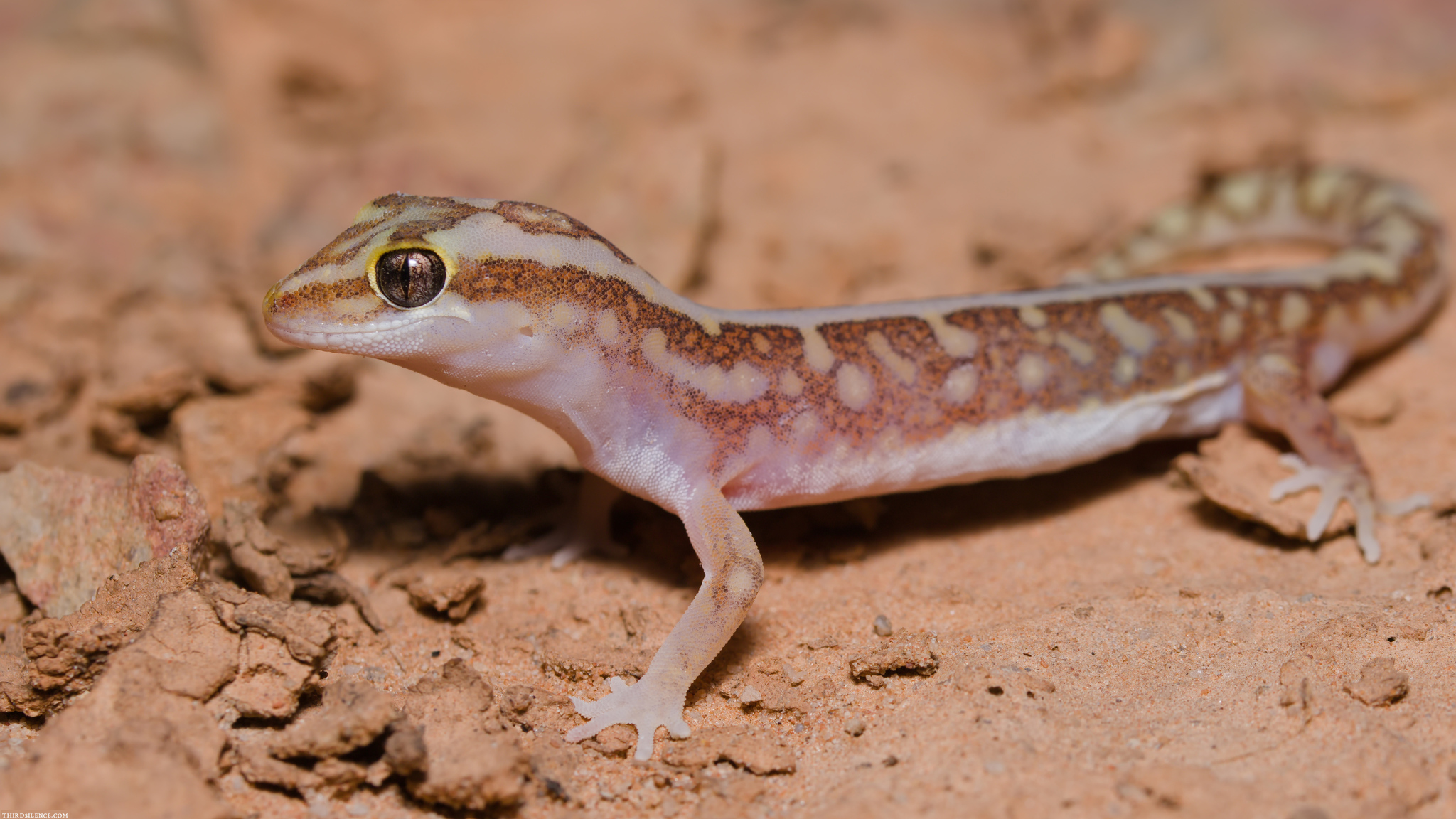
- Lucasium stenodactylum

Scientific classification
- Kingdom: Animalia
- Phylum: Chordata
- Class: Reptilia
- Order: Squamata
- Suborder: Gekkota
- Family: Diplodactylidae
- Genus: Lucasium; Wermuth, 1965

Species
- 14, see text.

= Lucasium =

Genus of lizards

Lucasium is a genus of lizards, sometimes called ground geckos, in the family Diplodactylidae. The genus is endemic to Australia, and it includes 14 species.

== Species ==
The following species are recognized as being valid:

- Lucasium alboguttatum (F. Werner, 1910) – white-spotted ground gecko
- Lucasium bungabinna Doughty & Hutchinson, 2008
- Lucasium byrnei (Lucas & C. Frost, 1896) – Byrne's gecko, gibber gecko
- Lucasium damaeum (Lucas & Frost, 1896) – beaded gecko
- Lucasium immaculatum (Storr, 1988) – pale-striped ground gecko
- Lucasium iris Vanderduys, Hoskin, Kutt, J.M. Wright & Zozaya, 2020 – Gilbert ground gecko
- Lucasium maini (Kluge, 1962) – Main's ground gecko
- Lucasium microplax Eastwood, Doughty, Hutchinson & Pepper, 2020
- Lucasium occultum (King, 1982) – Alligator Rivers gecko
- Lucasium squarrosum (Kluge, 1962) – mottled ground gecko
- Lucasium steindachneri (Boulenger, 1885) – box-patterned gecko, Steindachner's gecko
- Lucasium stenodactylum (Boulenger, 1896) – crowned gecko, pale-snouted ground gecko,
- Lucasium wombeyi (Storr, 1978) – Pilbara ground gecko
- Lucasium woodwardi (Fry, 1914) - Pilbara ground gecko

Nota bene: A binomial authority in parentheses indicates that the species was originally described in a genus other than Lucasium.

== Captivity ==
Both the beaded gecko and the box-patterned gecko can be kept as pets although a permit is required to keep them.
