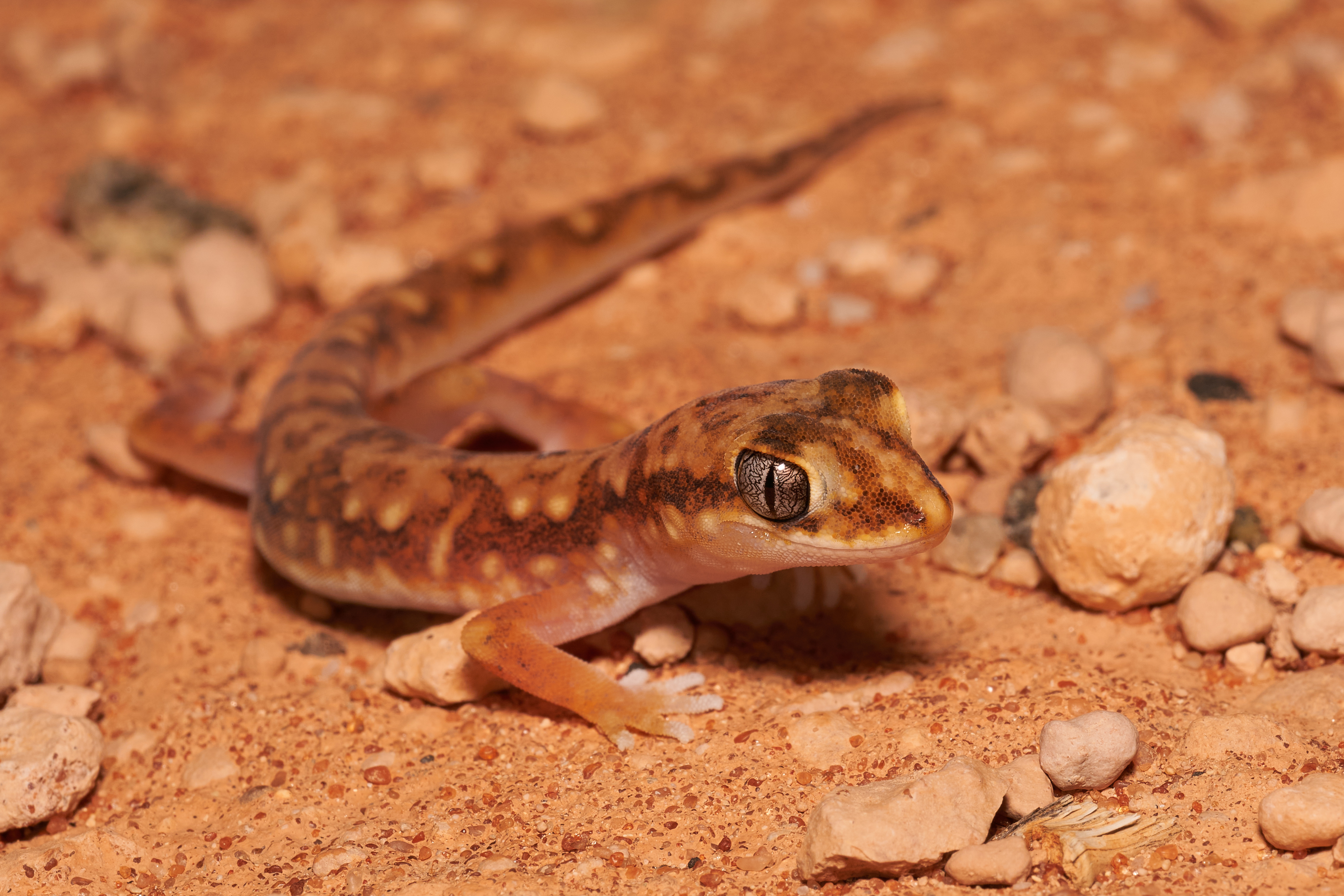

Conservation status
- Least Concern (IUCN 3.1)

Scientific classification
- Kingdom: Animalia
- Phylum: Chordata
- Class: Reptilia
- Order: Squamata
- Suborder: Gekkota
- Family: Diplodactylidae
- Genus: Lucasium
- Species: L. alboguttatum

Binomial name
- Lucasium alboguttatum (Werner, 1910)

Synonyms
- Diplodactylus alboguttatus

= Lucasium alboguttatum =

Species of lizard

Lucasium alboguttatum, or the white-spotted ground gecko, is a gecko endemic to Western Australia.
