= Lucasium bungabinna =

Conservation status
- Least Concern (IUCN 3.1)

Scientific classification
- Kingdom: Animalia
- Phylum: Chordata
- Class: Reptilia
- Order: Squamata
- Suborder: Gekkota
- Family: Diplodactylidae
- Genus: Lucasium
- Species: L. bungabinna

Binomial name
- Lucasium bungabinna Doughty & Hutchinson, 2008

Species of lizard

Lucasium bungabinna is a gecko endemic to Australia which is found in Western Australia and South Australia.
