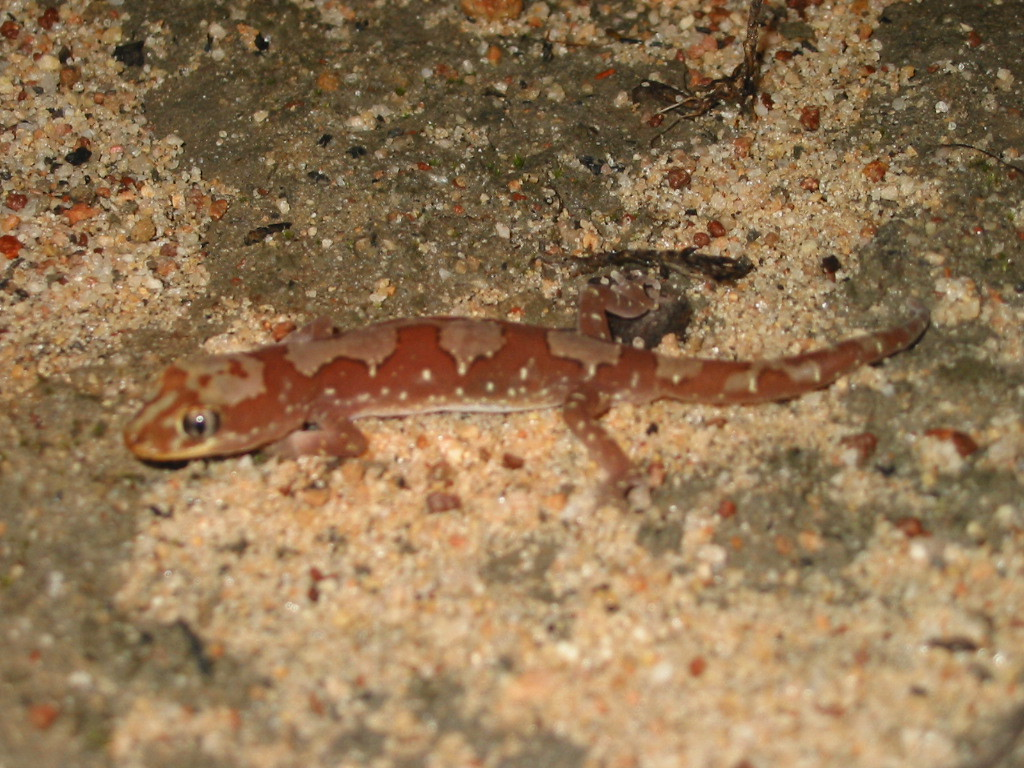

Conservation status
- Least Concern (IUCN 3.1)

Scientific classification
- Kingdom: Animalia
- Phylum: Chordata
- Class: Reptilia
- Order: Squamata
- Suborder: Gekkota
- Family: Diplodactylidae
- Genus: Lucasium
- Species: L. steindachneri

Binomial name
- Lucasium steindachneri (Boulenger, 1885)

Synonyms
- Diplodactylus steindachneri Boulenger, 1885; Diplodactylus stenurus F. Werner, 1910; Diplodactylus steindachneri — Zietz, 1920; Ozziedactylus steindachneri — Wells & Wellington, 1989; Lucasium steindachneri — P. Oliver, Hutchinson & S. Cooper, 2007

= Lucasium steindachneri =

Species of lizard

Lucasium steindachneri, commonly called the box-patterned gecko or Steindachner's gecko, is a species of nocturnal, medium-sized lizard in the family Diplodactylidae. The species has a pale strip with three patches of brown along its back. This gecko is terrestrial and only found in arid and semi-arid areas of continental Australia.

== Etymology ==
The specific name, steindachneri, is in honor of Austrian herpetologist Franz Steindachner.

== Description ==
The box-patterned gecko is a smooth-scaled reptile which grows to a maximum snout-to-vent length (SVL) of 59 mm (2.3 in), but on average grows to 45 mm (1.8 in) SVL. It has large circular eyes with vertical pupils, and lacks moveable eyelids. Each eye is covered by a clear scale. To clean its eyes it wipes its tongue over these clear scales. The box-patterned gecko can be distinguished by a pale dorsal strip running from its eyes down to the base of the tail, containing three oval patches of dark brown colour. It has pale spots and flecks along its sides and a long slender tail, which makes up 70% of its total length. The underneath side of the body and the underneath sides of the limbs are whitish. The feet have five digits with circular discs and large singular terminal plates.

== Feeding ==
The box-patterned gecko feeds on a varying array of arthropods such as insects, spiders and scorpions during the night.

== Behaviour ==
When D. steindachneri is threatened or captured, it will make a barking or hissing sound, open its mouth, and jump towards the predator. If this does not scare the intruder off, it will drop its tail, distracting the predator, and allowing the gecko to escape.

== Reproduction ==
A sexually mature female of D. steindachneri will lay one to two eggs during one year.

== Geographic range and habitat ==
The box-patterned gecko is distributed across arid and semi-arid areas of Australia within Queensland, New South Wales, and a small patch of eastern South Australia and the Northern Territory. This is commonly dry open woodlands, forests, and mallee country with heavy or stony soils. During the day it shelters in crevices in the ground, and it is most often found in disused insect holes. At night it emerges from its hole to forage for food.

== Taxonomy ==
The family Diplodactylidae comprises many species in Australia which are normally no larger than 150 mm (5.9 in) long with five digits that bear circular toe pads.
