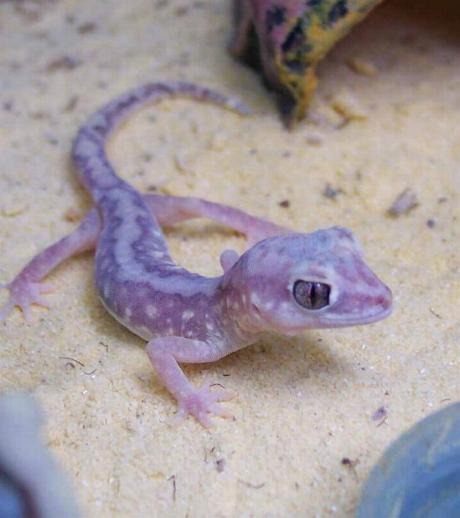
- Female

Conservation status
- Least Concern (IUCN 3.1)

Scientific classification
- Kingdom: Animalia
- Phylum: Chordata
- Class: Reptilia
- Order: Squamata
- Suborder: Gekkota
- Family: Diplodactylidae
- Genus: Lucasium
- Species: L. damaeum

Binomial name
- Lucasium damaeum Lucas & Frost, 1896

= Beaded gecko =

Species of lizard

The beaded gecko (Lucasium damaeum) is a gecko endemic to Australia.

== Description ==
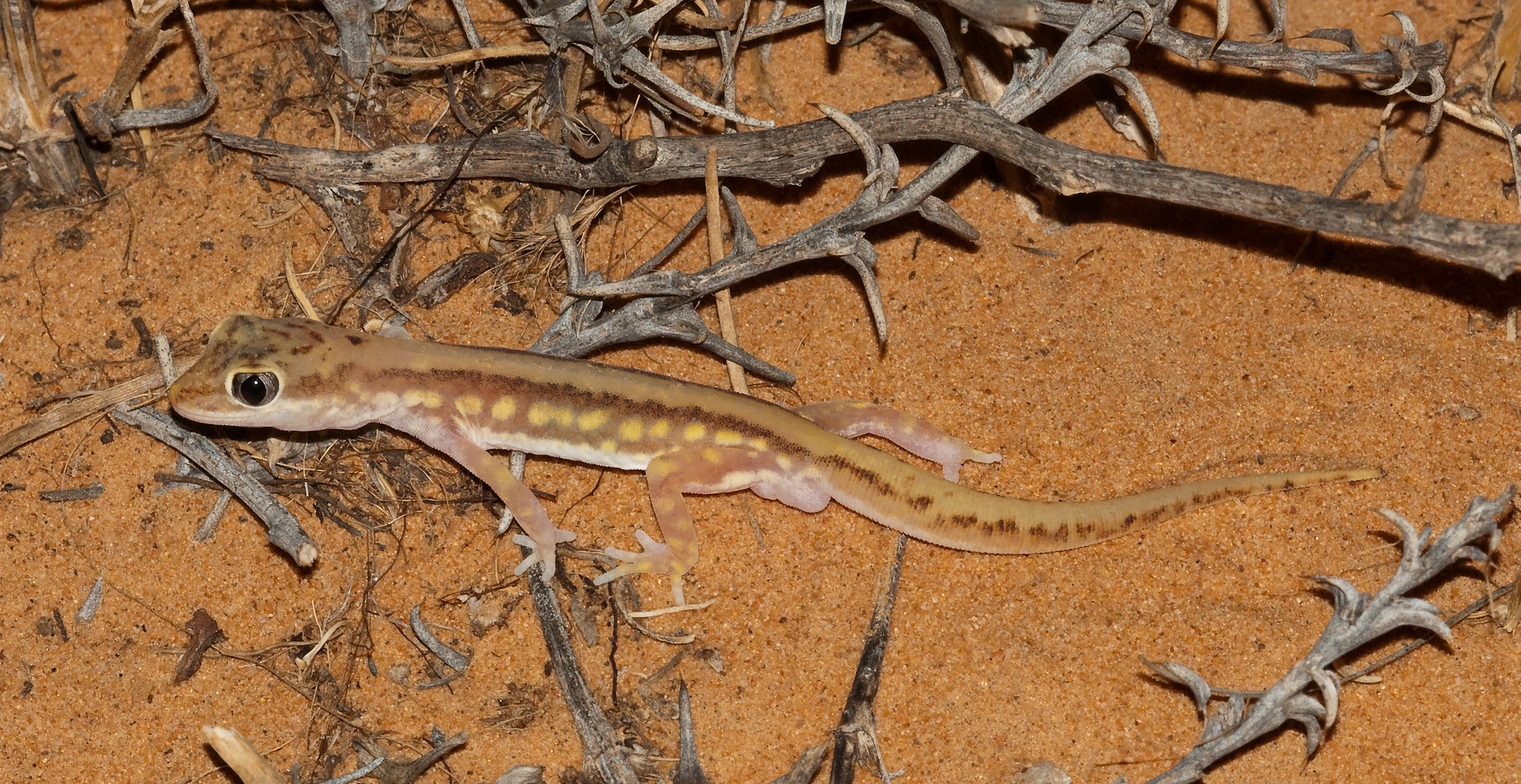
L. damaeum

With only a few species of the genus Lucasium it is endemic to Australia. The 7 cm long beaded gecko is reddish brown on top, with what looks like chains of beads surrounding the cream pale ridged vertebral strip, thus given the name of beaded gecko. Single lines of pale blotches run down the side of its body with scattered smaller spots covering its dark brown limbs and surrounding body. This gecko has a rounded snout rather than beaked (with the rostral connection to the nostril), reddish brown in colour with a white or cream upper eyelid that is not able to cover, protect or clean the eye, rather the eye is covered in protective transparent scales. To keep the eye clean they use their long flat tongue to wipe the eye. With relatively large eyes, the pupil is a thin vertical slit during the day and rounded and full in the dark. The tail is a straight continuum of the body and the original tail has continuing patterns from the body down but will reproduce plain brown or spotted darker tails. The toes of a beaded gecko are flat and unkinked without adhesive pads and usually whitish in colour. The feet of the beaded gecko are not suitable for climbing The beaded gecko is nocturnal. Hiding through the day and coming out at night they travel large distances in search of food.

== Distribution ==
Beaded geckos are found in drier arid to semi-arid climate parts of mainland Australia in all states and the Northern Territory.

== Ecology and habitat ==
The beaded gecko is a terrestrial (ground-dwelling) animal that can be found in a variety of dry desert habitats within mainland Australia from the savannah woodlands to spinifex-covered sandhills. During the day the gecko uses insects and spider holes for shelter before coming out at night to hunt in open areas. This swift-moving gecko covers large areas in search for food.

== Reproduction ==
The beaded gecko is oviparous, meaning it lays eggs rather than giving birth. Females are known to lay 2 eggs per clutch. Like most Australian reptiles, geckos have a breeding season which is from late September to December. Males have paired sex organs, each independent.

== Diet ==
Beaded geckos like most other small lizards feed mainly on insects. The jaw is surrounded with short fine teeth; however, prey is crushed by the gecko rather than chewed.

== Threats ==
Threats include loss of habitat, and feral predators like dogs, cats and foxes.
