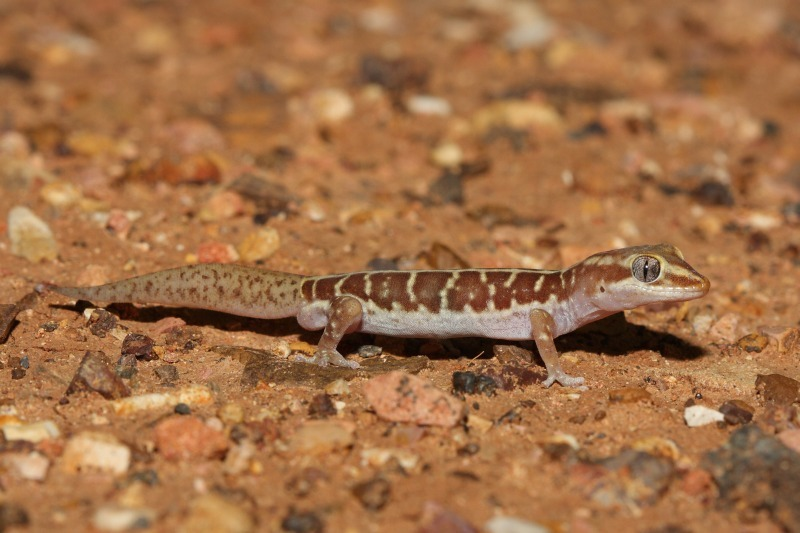

Conservation status
- Least Concern (IUCN 3.1)

Scientific classification
- Kingdom: Animalia
- Phylum: Chordata
- Class: Reptilia
- Order: Squamata
- Suborder: Gekkota
- Family: Diplodactylidae
- Genus: Lucasium
- Species: L. immaculatum

Binomial name
- Lucasium immaculatum (Storr, 1988)

Synonyms
- Diplodactylus immaculatus

= Pale-striped ground gecko =

Species of lizard

The pale-striped ground gecko (Lucasium immaculatum) is a gecko endemic to Australia.
