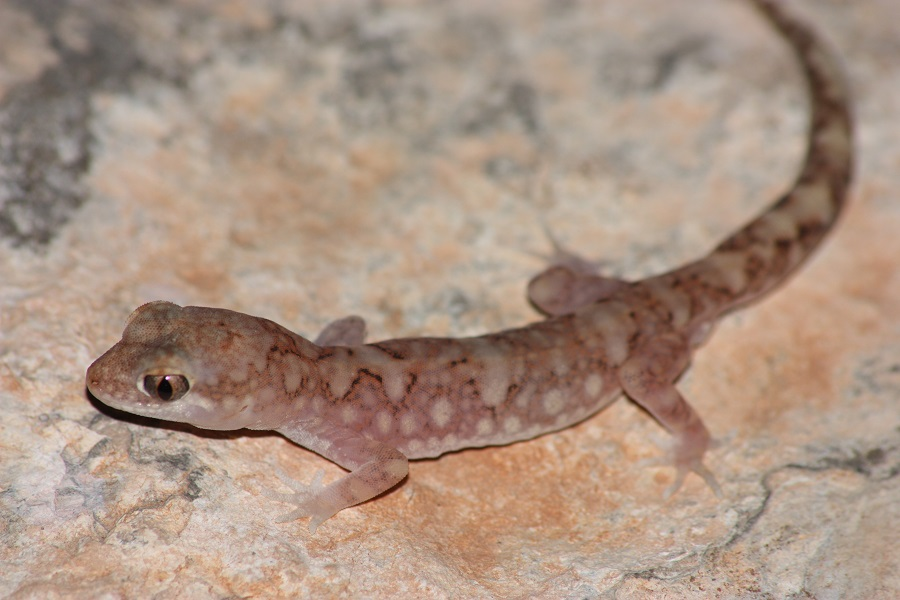
- Lucasium maini

Conservation status
- Least Concern (IUCN 3.1)

Scientific classification
- Domain: Eukaryota
- Kingdom: Animalia
- Phylum: Chordata
- Class: Reptilia
- Order: Squamata
- Infraorder: Gekkota
- Family: Diplodactylidae
- Genus: Lucasium
- Species: L. maini

Binomial name
- Lucasium maini (Kluge, 1962)

Synonyms
- Diplodactylus maini Kluge, 1962; Turnerdactylus maini — Wells & Wellington, 1989; Lucasium maini — Oliver et al., 2007

= Main's ground gecko =

Species of lizard

Main's ground gecko (Lucasium maini) is a species of gecko endemic to Australia.

== Etymology ==
The specific name, maini, is in honor of Australian ecologist Albert "Bert" Russell Main.

== Geographic range ==
L. maini is found in the southern part of the Australian state of Western Australia.

== Habitat ==
The preferred habitats of L. maini are savanna and shrubland, in arid and semi-arid regions.

== Reproduction ==
L. maini is oviparous.
