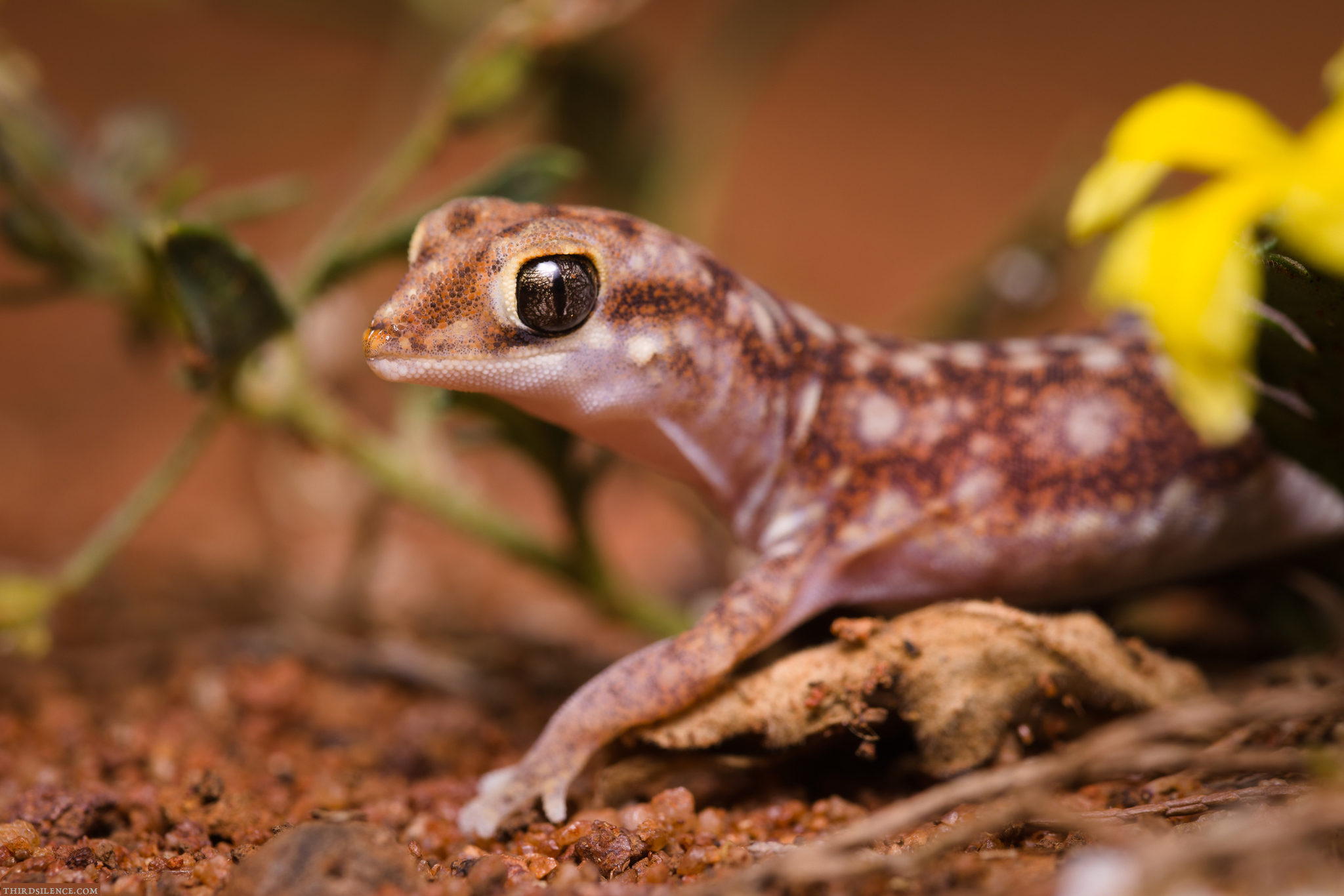

Conservation status
- Least Concern (IUCN 3.1)

Scientific classification
- Kingdom: Animalia
- Phylum: Chordata
- Class: Reptilia
- Order: Squamata
- Suborder: Gekkota
- Family: Diplodactylidae
- Genus: Rhynchoedura
- Species: R. ormsbyi

Binomial name
- Rhynchoedura ormsbyi Wells & Wellington, 1985
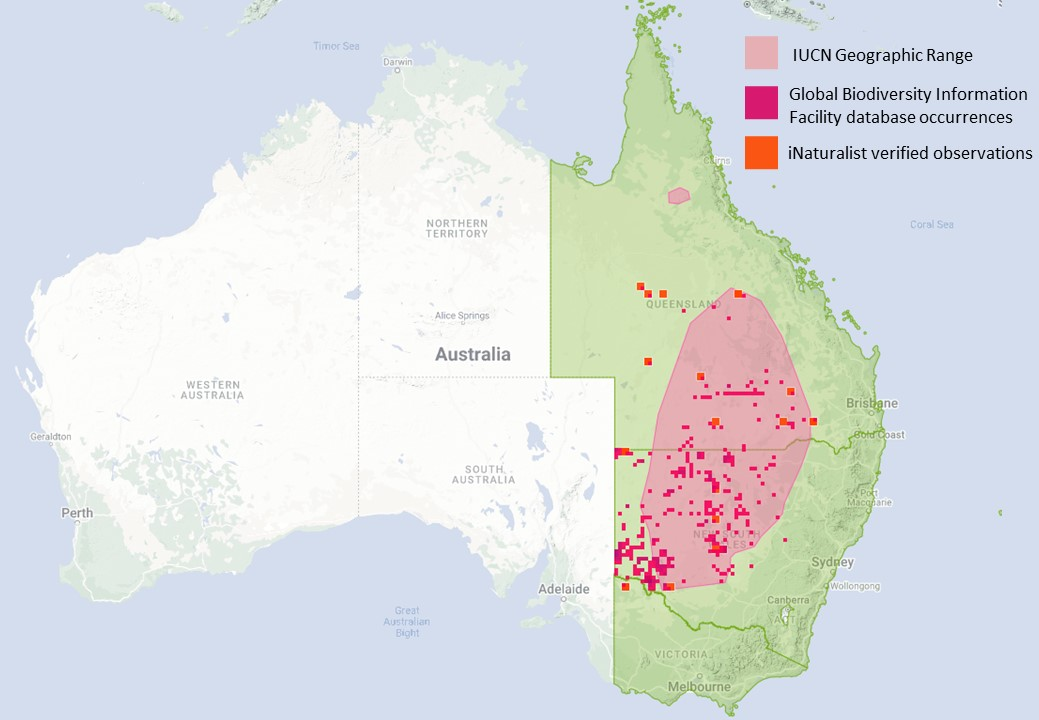
- Distribution

= Eastern beaked gecko =

Species of lizard

The eastern beaked gecko (Rhynchoedura ormsbyi) is a gecko endemic to arid zones of New South Wales and Queensland in Australia.

== Taxonomy ==
The species was described by Richard W. Wells and Cliff R. Wellington in 1985 as Rhynchoedura ormsbyi. Rhynchoedura is an assemblage of desert Gekkonids, with R. ormsbyi being distinguished from Rhynchoedura ornata with a combination of traits, especially with the shape of the snout, composition of the scales, and the arrangement of the pre-anal pores. The first description of the species was described by Albert Günther as Rhynchoedura ornata in 1867, where the current species of R. ornata and R. ormsbyi were not differentiated. The species was redescribed by Richard W. Wells and Cliff R. Wellington as R. ormsbyi in 1985, then was resurrected by Mitzy Pepper as R. ormsbyi in 2011.

=== Etymology ===
The species name ormsbyi was named after Anthony Ormsby, the Australian herpetologist from Springwood, New South Wales.

== Description ==
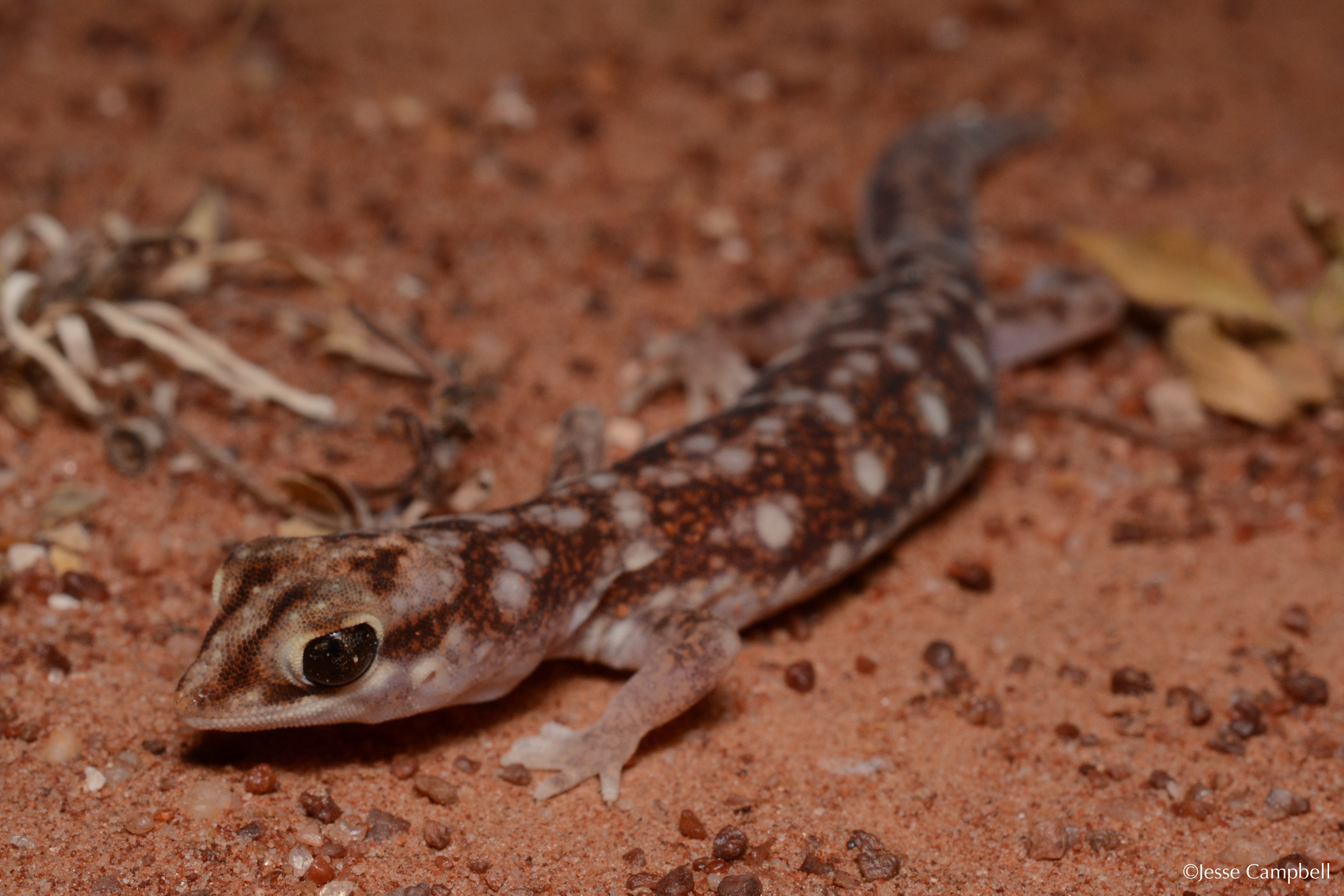
Eastern beaked gecko (Rhynchoedura ormsbyi')

The eastern beaked gecko is a desert Gekkonid. The snout-vent length is up to 50 mm, with the snout having a beak-like shape formed by a protruding rostral and a large mental scale. The species has a slender tail and slender, clawed digits. The skin is covered by tubercle, granule, and intergranule scales. These scales are covered in long spinules surrounded by struts and pits. The dorsal pattern varies in composition of the a light vertebral patches with wavy edges on a dark ground colour. The dorsal side of the head contains pale white to off-white spots with brown edges.

The species can be distinguished from R. ornata genetically and by the strong medial groove on the rostra that can extend between 50-100% of the mental scale on the snout. A distinguishing trait from R. sexapora, and R. mentalis are the two large elongated pre-anal pores, and the individual enlarged scales forming the cloacal spurs.

== Ecology and behaviour ==
The species lives in arid areas with xeric moisture regimes and is ubiquitous to most terrestrial habitat in the range, but most commonly in areas of sparse vegetation. The habitat is in the low-lying eastern arid zone where they are prominent in the alluvial floodplains and Eucalyptus and mulga woodlands.

The species has a specialised diet exclusively made up of termites which is efficient as the termites occur in colonies, being a concentrated food supply with little energy use once the colonies are located. The species is nocturnal, most active between sunset and midnight. Diurnal retreats are underground in holes such as spider holes.

The skin has high hydrophobic properties as a trait of the small scales and long spinules. This maintains the cleanliness of the skin from dirt, debris, and harmful bacteria.

Reproduction is via an oviparous with a clutch size of two eggs.

The species is predated on largely by reptiles and owls. The tail of the species is able to detach if it is attacked to escape predation.

=== Evolutionary relationships ===
Species of the genus Rhynchoedura are genetically and morphologically differentiated as species populations have been spatially divided and thus have diverged in allopatry speciation. This division is from barriers caused by aridification and drainage divisions and rivers, especially in periods of high rainfall. The Rhynchoedura species division basins are; R. ormsbyi (Throughout the Murray-Darling drainages), R. eyrensis (Lake Eyre Basin), R. augusta (Narrow distribution between Lake Eyre and the Murray-Darling drainages), R. ornata (Western Plateau), and R.sexapora (Kimberley).

== Distribution ==
The eastern beaked gecko is endemic to arid areas in New South Wales and Queensland. The range is throughout the Mulga Lands and Cobar Peneplain Bioregions, the NSW area of the Simpson Strzelecki Dunefields Bioregion, and covers north up to the northern Murray-Darling Basin.

== Conservation status ==
The conservation status of the species is Least Concern (IUCN) as of 2017. There is limited loss of habitat largely due to agricultural practices, especially from cotton crops; however, these are not expected to cause significant decline. The population trend is stable, although there is a decline of mature individuals. Populations are severely fragmented and have extreme fluctuations in area occupied.
