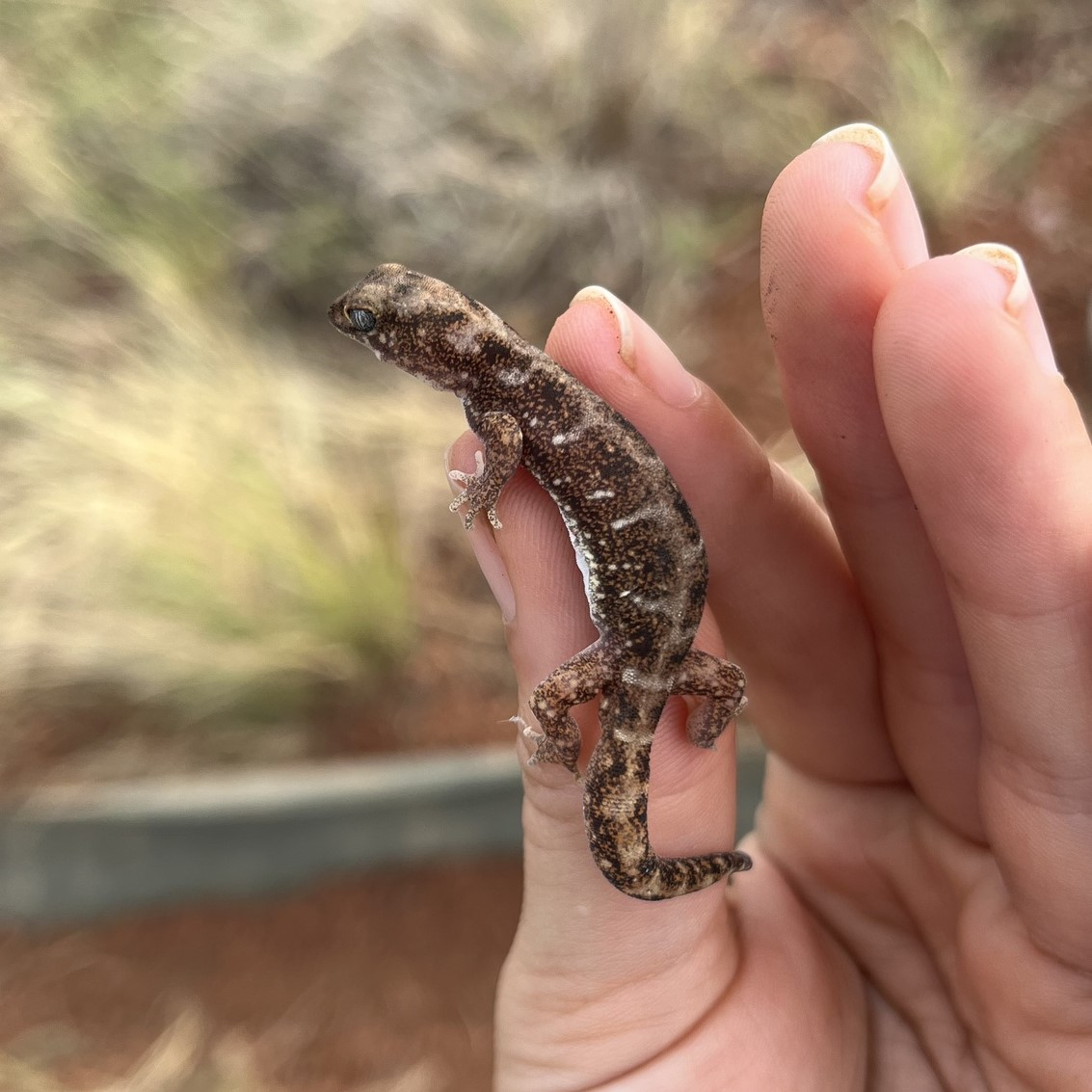

Conservation status
- Least Concern (IUCN 3.1)

Scientific classification
- Kingdom: Animalia
- Phylum: Chordata
- Class: Reptilia
- Order: Squamata
- Suborder: Gekkota
- Family: Diplodactylidae
- Genus: Rhynchoedura
- Species: R. mentalis

Binomial name
- Rhynchoedura mentalis Pepper, Doughty, Hutchinson, & Keogh, 2011

= Brigalow beaked gecko =

Species of lizard

The Brigalow beaked gecko (Rhynchoedura mentalis) is a species of gecko endemic to Australia.
