= Menetia concinna =

Scientific classification
- Domain: Eukaryota
- Kingdom: Animalia
- Phylum: Chordata
- Class: Reptilia
- Order: Squamata
- Family: Scincidae
- Genus: Menetia
- Species: M. concinna

Binomial name
- Menetia concinna Sadlier, 1984
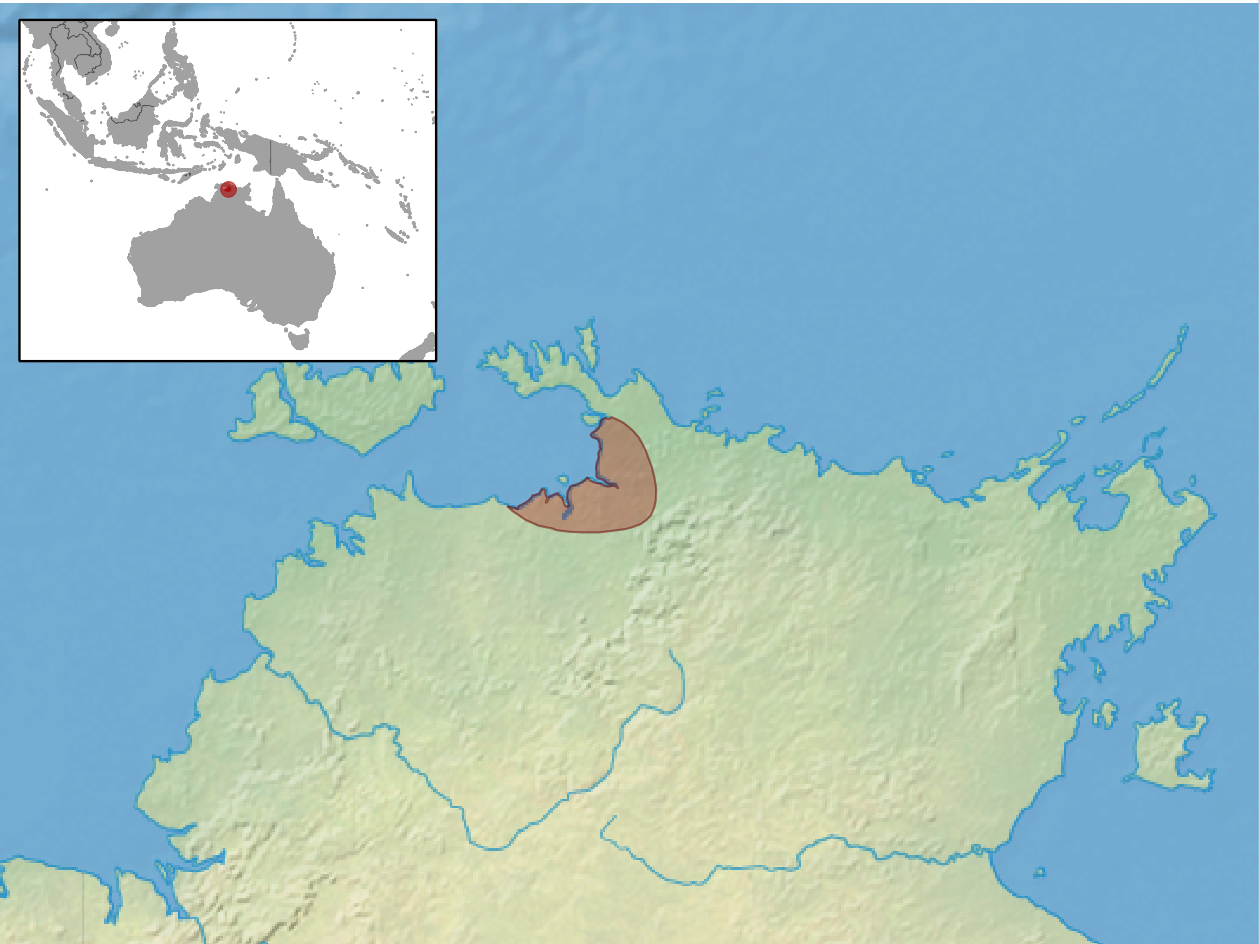

Species of lizard

Menetia concinna, the Jabiluka dwarf skink, is a species of skink found in Northern Territory in Australia.
