= Menetia alanae =

Conservation status
- Least Concern (IUCN 3.1)

Scientific classification
- Kingdom: Animalia
- Phylum: Chordata
- Class: Reptilia
- Order: Squamata
- Family: Scincidae
- Genus: Menetia
- Species: M. alanae

Binomial name
- Menetia alanae Rankin, 1979

Species of lizard

Menetia alanae, also known commonly as Alana's menetia and the Top End dwarf skink, is a species of lizard in the family Scincidae. The species is endemic to Australia.

== Etymology ==
The specific name, alanae (genitive, feminine) is in honor of Australian herpetologist Alana Young.

== Geographic range ==
M. alanae is found in Northern Territory in Australia.

== Habitat ==
The preferred natural habitats of M. alanae are forest and savanna.

== Description ==
M. alanae is a small, long-tailed skink. It may attain a snout-to-vent length (SVL) of 29 mm (1.1 in). The tail is 1.3 times SVL.

== Reproduction ==
M. alanae is oviparous.
