= Menetia surda =

Scientific classification
- Domain: Eukaryota
- Kingdom: Animalia
- Phylum: Chordata
- Class: Reptilia
- Order: Squamata
- Family: Scincidae
- Genus: Menetia
- Species: M. surda

Binomial name
- Menetia surda Storr, 1976

Species of lizard

Menetia surda, the western dwarf skink, is a species of skink found in Western Australia.
