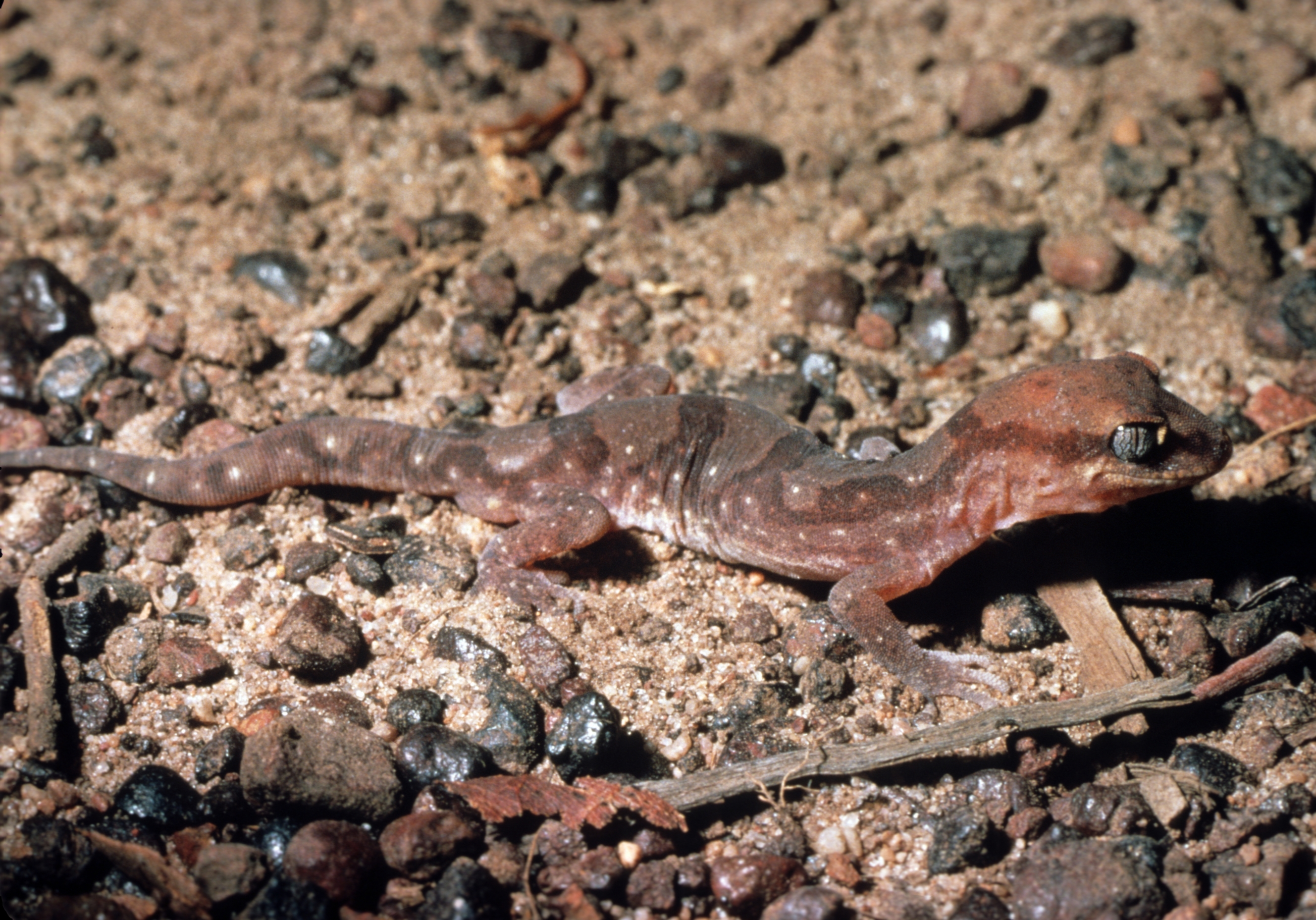

Conservation status
- Endangered (IUCN 3.1)

Scientific classification
- Domain: Eukaryota
- Kingdom: Animalia
- Phylum: Chordata
- Class: Reptilia
- Order: Squamata
- Infraorder: Gekkota
- Family: Diplodactylidae
- Genus: Lucasium
- Species: L. occultum

Binomial name
- Lucasium occultum (King, 1982)

Synonyms
- Diplodactylus occultus

= Alligator River gecko =

Species of lizard

The Alligator River gecko (Lucasium occultum) is a gecko native to Australia.
