= Mottled ground gecko =

Conservation status
- Least Concern (IUCN 3.1)

Scientific classification
- Kingdom: Animalia
- Phylum: Chordata
- Class: Reptilia
- Order: Squamata
- Suborder: Gekkota
- Family: Diplodactylidae
- Genus: Lucasium
- Species: L. squarrosum

Binomial name
- Lucasium squarrosum (Kluge, 1962)

Synonyms
- Diplodactylus squarrosus

Species of lizard

The mottled ground gecko (Lucasium squarrosum) is a gecko endemic to Australia.
