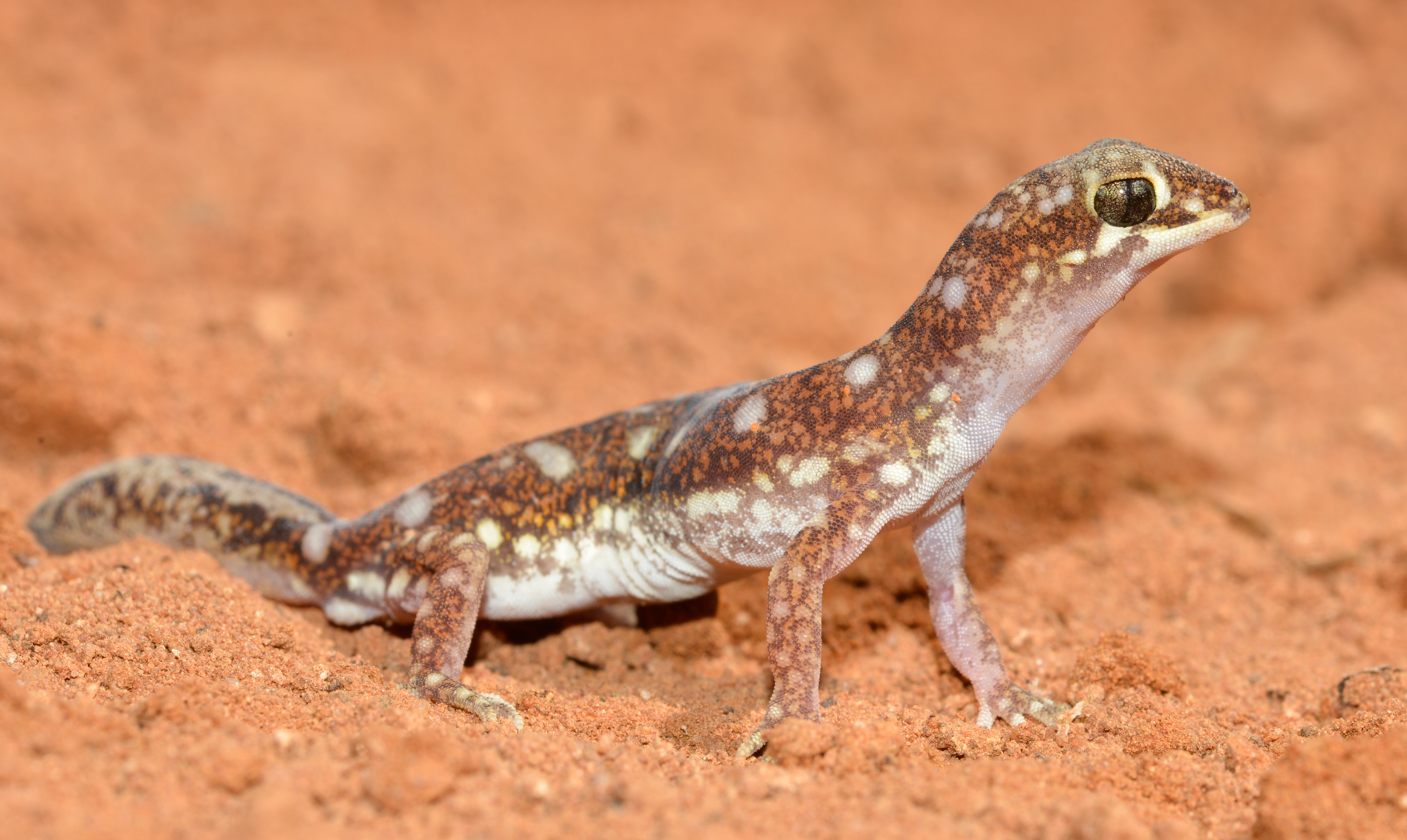
- Rhynchoedura sp.

Scientific classification
- Domain: Eukaryota
- Kingdom: Animalia
- Phylum: Chordata
- Class: Reptilia
- Order: Squamata
- Infraorder: Gekkota
- Family: Diplodactylidae
- Genus: Rhynchoedura; Günther, 1867

= Rhynchoedura =

Genus of lizards

Rhynchoedura is a genus of lizards in the family Diplodactylidae. It includes six species, commonly known as beaked geckos, all of which are endemic to the arid zone of the Australian outback.

Members of the genus are terrestrial and nocturnal, sheltering by day in spider burrows. They specialize in eating termites and are most abundant in open, recently burned areas. They can be characterized by their long bodies and narrow heads with enlarged scales at the tip of the snout. Rhynchoedura species are widespread and occupy a range of dry woodland, shrubland, grassland, and desert environments, and none are currently considered to be at risk of extinction.

The genus was traditionally regarded as monotypic, with the single species Rhynchoedura ornata named by Albert Günther in 1867. A second species was described in 1985, though without widespread recognition at the time. In 2011 an extensive revision sampling the population across Australia found overlooked genetic diversity in the genus and named four new cryptic species. Each Rhynchoedura species is native to a specific perennial river drainage, and active rivers during wet periods of the Neogene could have led to allopatric speciation within the genus.

== Species ==
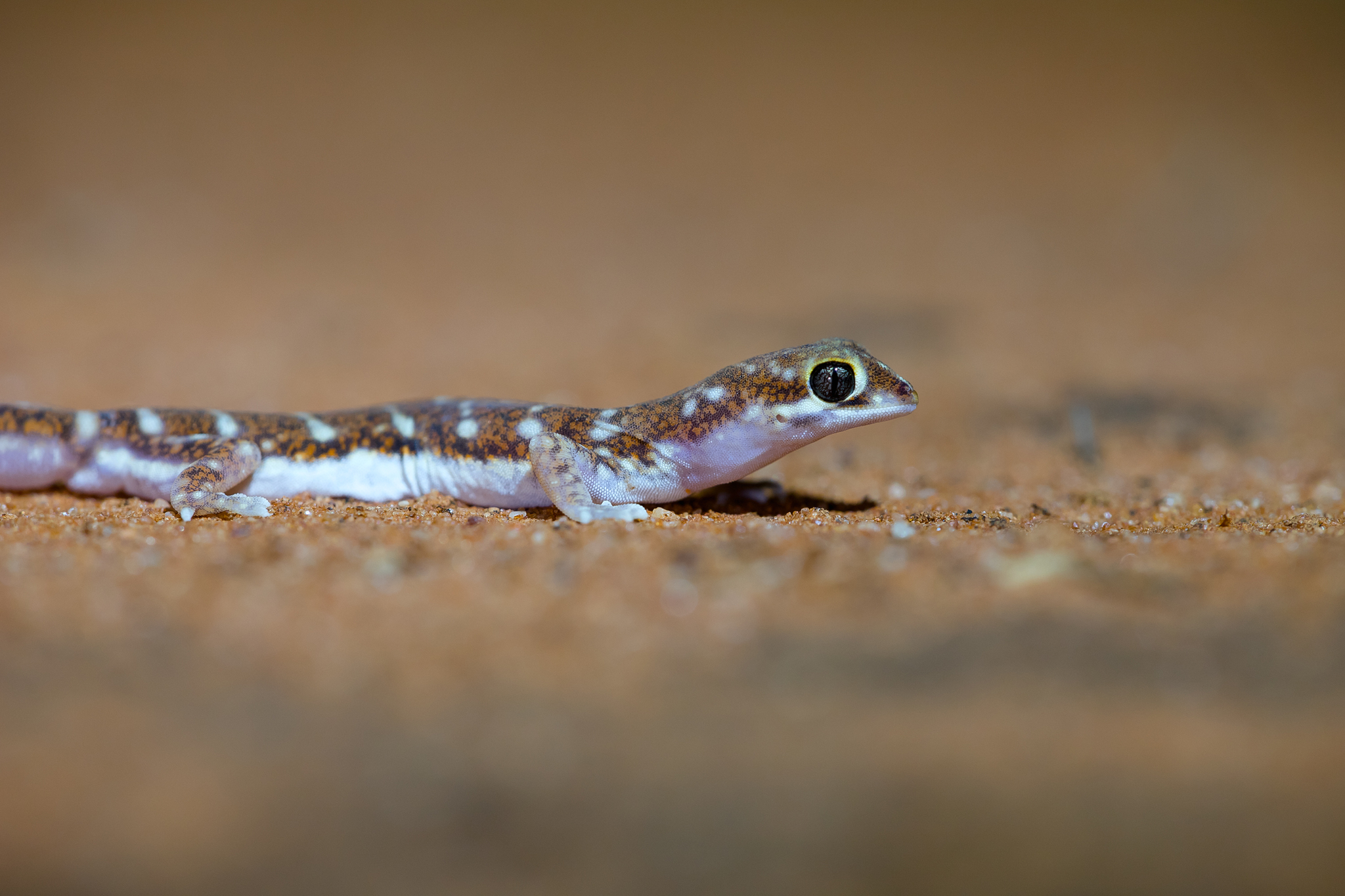
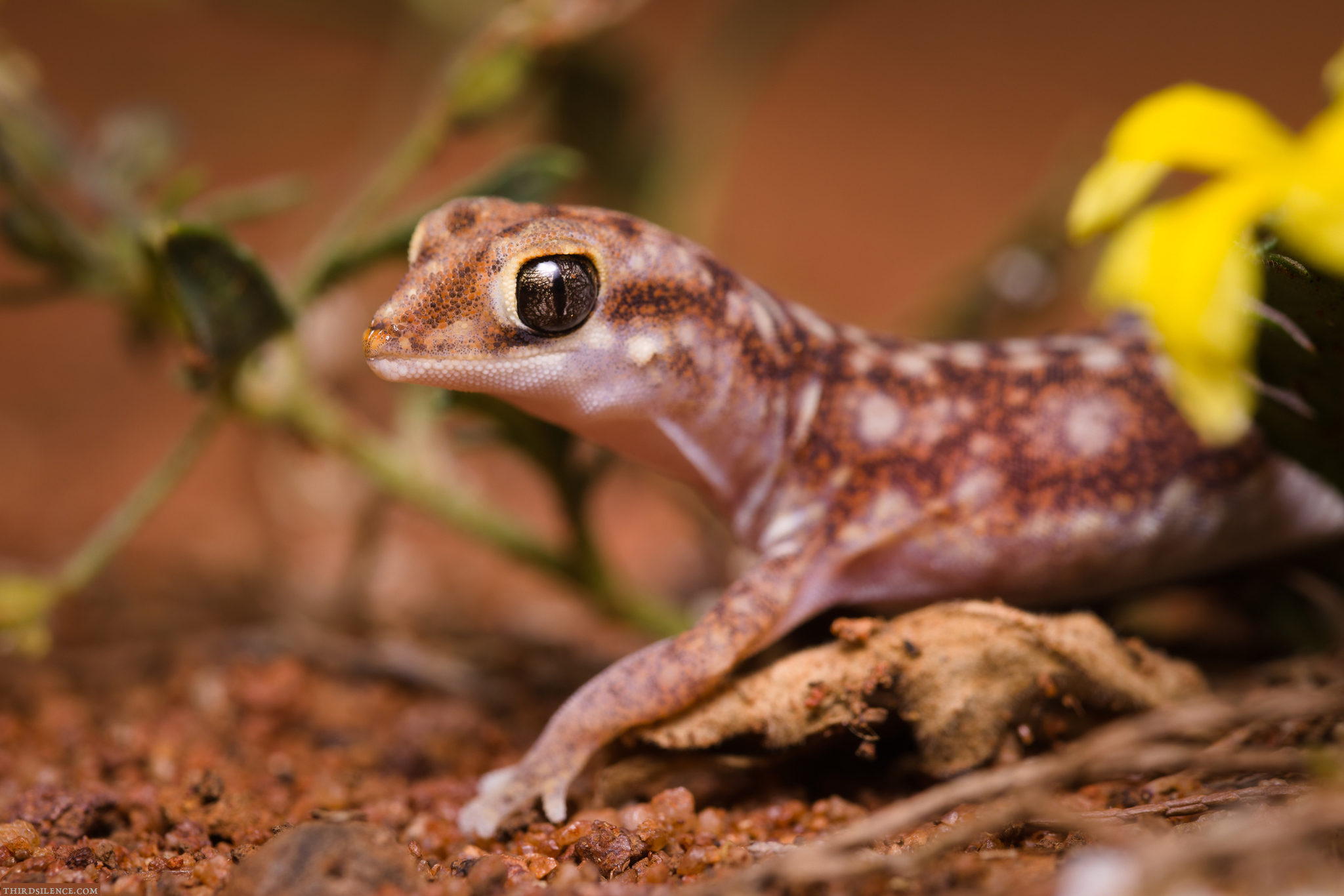
Image	Species	Taxon author	Common name	Distribution	IUCN status
	R. angusta	Pepper, Doughty, Hutchinson, & Keough, 2011	Border beaked gecko	Bulloo-Bancannia drainage basin, from western Queensland south to the border of western New South Wales and eastern South Australia	Least Concern
	R. eyrensis	Pepper, Doughty, Hutchinson, & Keough, 2011	Eyre Basin beaked gecko	Lake Eyre basin, eastern South Australia and surrounding areas	Least Concern
	R. mentalis	Pepper, Doughty, Hutchinson, & Keough, 2011	Brigalow beaked gecko	Southern Queensland	Least Concern
	R. ormsbyi	Wells & Wellington, 1985	Eastern beaked gecko	Murray-Darling basin, New South Wales north to southern Queensland	Least Concern
	R. ornata	Günther, 1867	Western beaked gecko	Western Australia and the western portions of the Northern Territory and South Australia	Least Concern
	R. sexapora	Pepper, Doughty, Hutchinson, & Keough, 2011	Northern beaked gecko	Kimberley region of Western Australia east to the Top End of the Northern Territory	Least Concern
