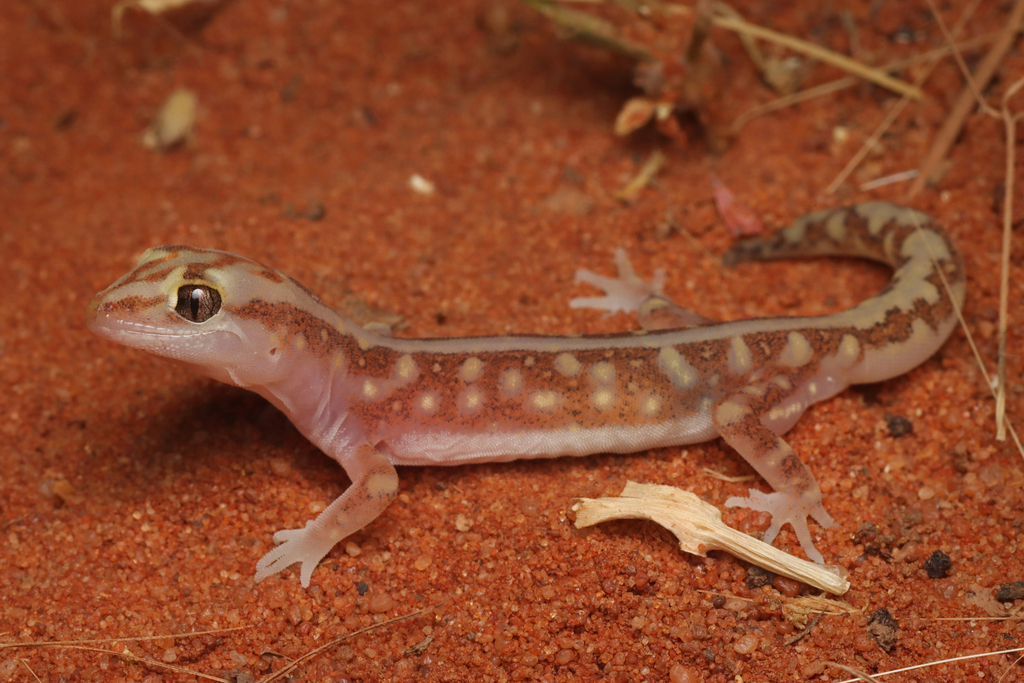

Scientific classification
- Kingdom: Animalia
- Phylum: Chordata
- Class: Reptilia
- Order: Squamata
- Suborder: Gekkota
- Family: Diplodactylidae
- Genus: Lucasium
- Species: L. microplax

Binomial name
- Lucasium microplax Eastwood, Doughty, Hutchinson, & Pepper, 2020

= Lucasium microplax =

Species of gecko

Lucasium microplax (formerly Lucasium stenodactylus), the southern sandplain gecko, is a terrestrial gecko in the family Diplodactylidae, endemic to the arid zones of central-southern Australia.

== Description ==
Lucasium microplax is a small to medium-sized, slender gecko with a cylindrical body and a triangular head tapering to a rounded snout tip. Its snout-vent length (SVL) averages around 48 - 49 mm, with a relatively short tail length that is roughly 70% of its SVL.

Lucasium microplax is dark reddish-brown in colour with a highly defined, straight-edged, pale beige vertebral stripe outlined narrowly in black. This stripe forks at the neck, continuing through the eyes to the tip of the snout. The sides of the body feature a simple pattern of large, high-contrast pale yellow spots that sometimes connect to the vertebral stripe.

== Distribution and habitat ==
The species has a unique distribution that largely aligns with the borders of South Australia, occurring widely across the central and northern parts of the state. Its range extends slightly into neighbouring regions including eastern Western Australia, south-central Northern Territory, southwestern Queensland and the extreme northwest of New South Wales. In NSW, populations are known in four distinct locations in the state's far west; these are Sturt National Park, Mutawintji National Park, Loch Lilly, 125km south of Broken Hill, and Thurloo Downs, 145km east of Tibooburra.

Lucasium microplax is a terrestrial species and occupies a variety of arid substrates including compact sand, coarse sand, sandy clay, and stony country. It is not known to inhabit soft sand dunes, cracking clay, or gibber plains.

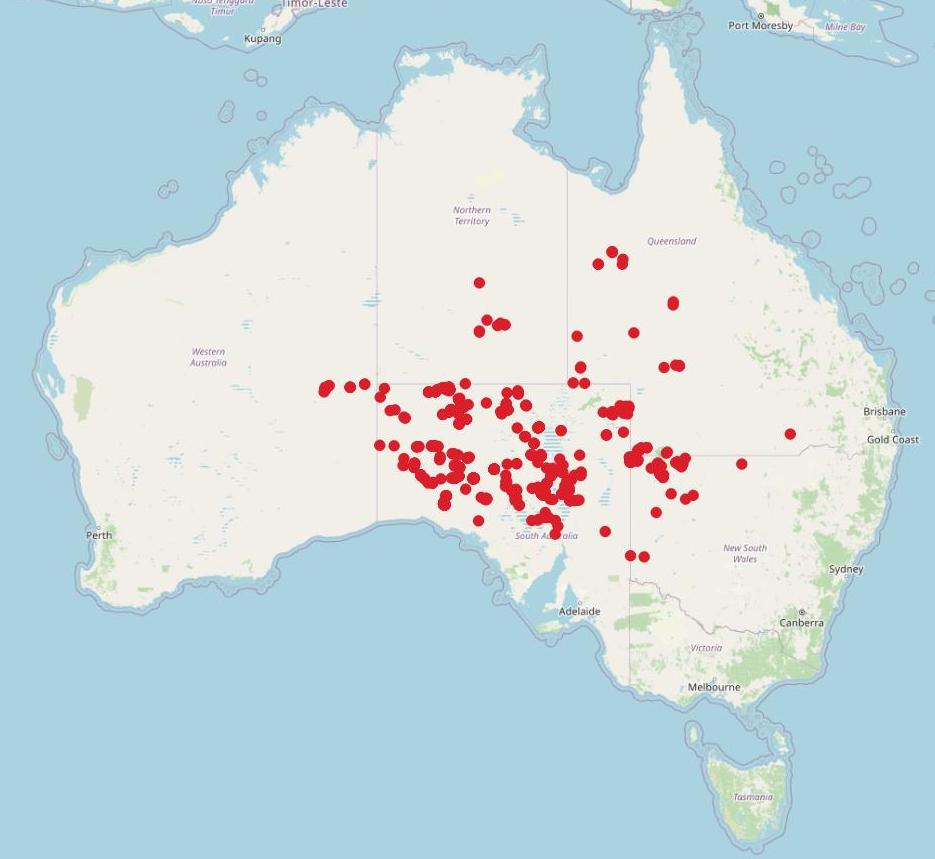
Distribution map of Lucasium microplax (Species occurrence data obtained from Atlas of Living Australia.

== Behaviour and ecology ==
Lucasium microplax forages nocturnally in arid and semi-arid habitats.

Like most Lucasium species, it is primarily ground-dwelling, although the genus exhibits considerable variation in toe pad development. The functional significance of this variation remains poorly understood, with little evidence that toe pad morphology consistently reflects substrate use or behaviour. Further nocturnal behavioural studies may help determine whether toe pad morphology is functionally linked to differences in behaviour and habitat use.

== Taxonomy ==
The genus Lucasium was originally described by Wermuth (1965). Specimen populations of L. microplax were recognised as distinct as early as 1967 by A.G Kluge, who designated them as "population B" of Lucasium stenodactylus. However, modern molecular genetics and detailed morphological analysis in a 2020 study by Eastwood, Doughty, Hutchinson & Pepper, confirmed that it is a distinct species.

== Conservation status ==
Lucasium microplax is not listed as threatened under the EPBC Act 1999, although its conservation status varies between Australian jurisdictions.

In New South Wales, it is listed as Vulnerable under the Biodiversity Conservation Act 2016 after being recognised as a distinct cryptic species with a more restricted distribution and smaller population than previously understood. It is not listed as threatened in Queensland, Western Australia, South Australia or the Northern Territory, where it is more widespread.

Key threats to L. microplax include habitat degradation, predation by introduced species, and population fragmentation, which reduces genetic connectivity and increases extinction risk from stochastic events such as prolonged droughts or intense wildfires.
