= Lucasium iris =

Scientific classification
- Kingdom: Animalia
- Phylum: Chordata
- Class: Reptilia
- Order: Squamata
- Suborder: Gekkota
- Family: Diplodactylidae
- Genus: Lucasium
- Species: L. iris

Binomial name
- Lucasium iris Vanderduys, Hoskin, Kutt, J.M. Wright & Zozaya, 2020

Species of lizard

Lucasium iris, the Gilbert ground gecko, is a gecko endemic to Australia.
