= Western beaked gecko =

Conservation status
- Least Concern (IUCN 3.1)

Scientific classification
- Domain: Eukaryota
- Kingdom: Animalia
- Phylum: Chordata
- Class: Reptilia
- Order: Squamata
- Infraorder: Gekkota
- Family: Diplodactylidae
- Genus: Rhynchoedura
- Species: R. ornata

Binomial name
- Rhynchoedura ornata Günther, 1867

Synonyms
- Diplodactylus paraornatus

Species of lizard

The western beaked gecko (Rhynchoedura ornata) is a species of gecko found throughout the interior of Australia.

== Taxonomy ==
The species was first described by Albert Günther in 1867. It is placed in the Rhynchoedura genus, which are found throughout Australasia. This group shares characteristics with several species of Diplodactylus, the conspicillatus group, Glen Storr has suggested that these could be transferred to this genus. Many of the characters of this species are found in Diplodactylus stenodactylus, their appearance, habitat and distribution, and Diplodactylus pulcher has a similar snout and vertebrae. Synonyms for this species include Diplodactylus paraornatus and Rhynchoedura ormsbyi published by Wells & Wellington.

Research into the phylogenetic relationships of Diplodactylus has identified two clades, and the resurrection of Lucasium has been proposed. Rhynchoedura was found to be distinct from D. byrnei, D. steindachneri and the stenodactylus group, but may be considered as a sister group to these.

== Description ==
It is a small nocturnal gecko up to 95 millimetres, snout vent length to 50 mm, with a long slender tail. The snout is narrow and beak-like, its characteristic pinched head readily distinguishes it from other gecko species. Occasionally the species is found beneath shrubs, but it most often shelters in the abandoned burrows of spiders and other lizards. It is reddish-brown to red above, with tiny yellow, brown, and white spots. A light brown or grey colour is found on the head. A creamy or white stripe extends from below the eyes, the lower surface of the body is stark white. Its favoured prey are termites.

The small digits of the species are slender and clawed. The small beak structure is formed by the projections of the rostral and mental shields. Preanal pores are present. This gecko regulates its temperature by moving to warmer or cooler positions. The female of the species is often larger and matures at an early age, less than 1 year, which allows greater development of its eggs for increased viability of its offspring. They produce two leathery eggs.

It is an endangered species, listed as a Schedule 4, requiring an "advanced" license to own and written notice of any transactions involving it, according to Victorian wildlife laws.

== Distribution and habitat ==
The western beaked gecko is widespread and common across Australia, primarily in its interior. It is found in arid to semi-arid regions of the country, in a wide variety of habitats and soil types. Its range covers New South Wales, Northern Territory, Queensland, South Australia, Victoria, and Western Australia. It does not occur on southern coastal regions or in the tropical north.

The distribution in Western Australia is in northeastern parts of Southwest Australia, extending to the northern and northwest coasts. Its type location is Nickol Bay.

The habitat may be sand hills or plains, often associated with Triodia, and country such as mallee and mulga. The individuals maintain a small range, around 30 metres, during their lifetime.
