= Lucasium woodwardi =

Scientific classification
- Domain: Eukaryota
- Kingdom: Animalia
- Phylum: Chordata
- Class: Reptilia
- Order: Squamata
- Infraorder: Gekkota
- Family: Diplodactylidae
- Genus: Lucasium
- Species: L. woodwardi

Binomial name
- Lucasium woodwardi (Fry, 1914)

Species of lizard

Lucasium woodwardi, the Pilbara ground gecko, is a gecko endemic to Australia which is found in Western Australia.
