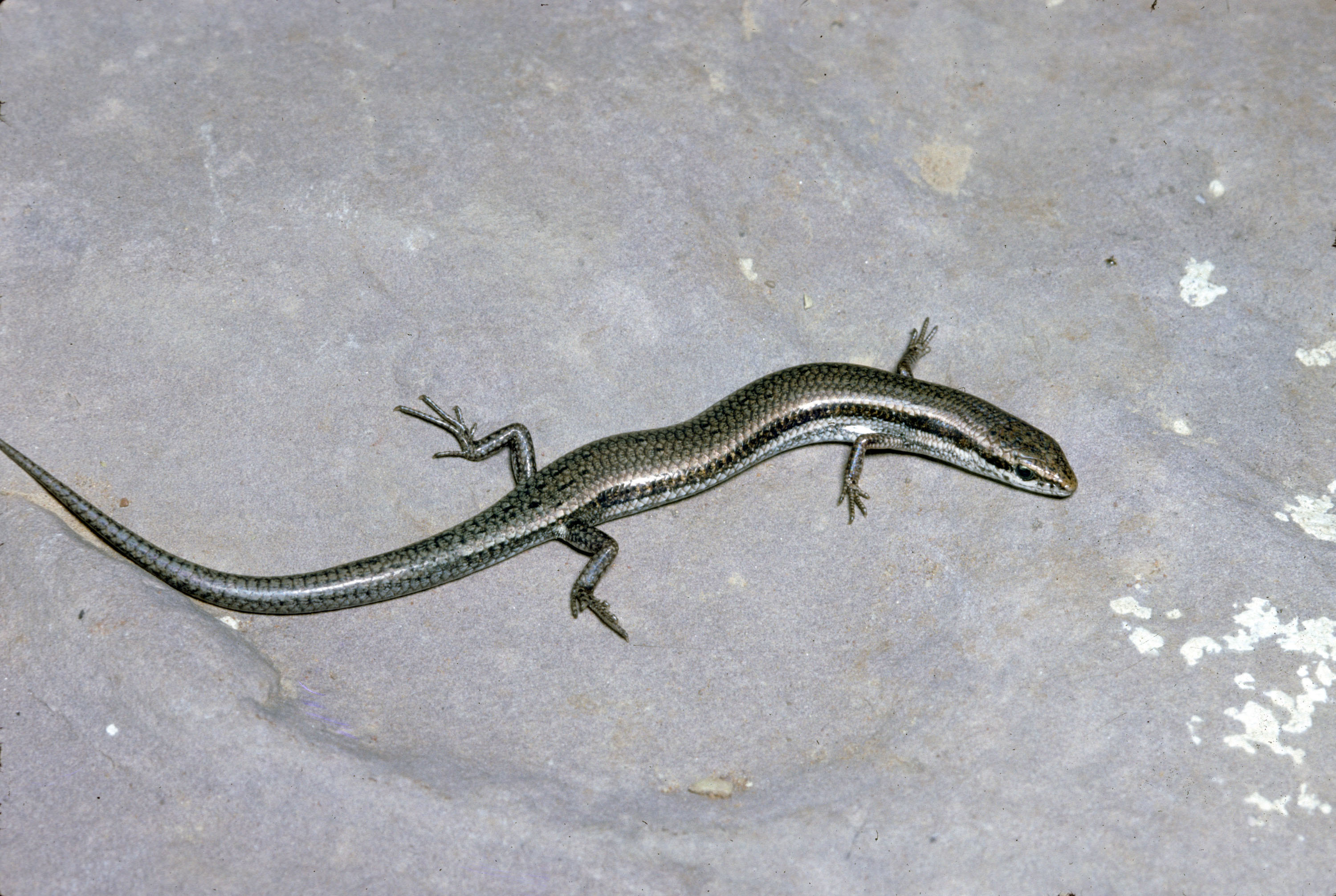

Conservation status
- Least Concern (IUCN 3.1)

Scientific classification
- Kingdom: Animalia
- Phylum: Chordata
- Class: Reptilia
- Order: Squamata
- Family: Scincidae
- Genus: Menetia
- Species: M. greyii

Binomial name
- Menetia greyii Gray, 1845

Synonyms
- Menetia greyii Gray, 1845; Ablepharus greyii — Glauert, 1960; Menetia greyii – Greer, 1974

= Menetia greyii =

Species of lizard

Menetia greyii, commonly known as the common dwarf skink or Grey's skink, is a species of lizard in the family Scincidae. The species is native to mainland Australia and Indonesia.

== Etymology ==
The specific name, greyii, is in honour of explorer George Grey, who became Governor of South Australia and later Governor of New Zealand. George Grey was born 14 April 1812 in Lisbon, Portugal. Inspired by Charles Sturt's discoveries in Australia, in 1836 Grey left to attempt to establish a settlement in Australia's north-west. He was knighted in 1848. After many accomplishments in Australia, New Zealand and South Africa, Grey returned to London in 1894 and died in 1898.

== Geographic range ==
One of Australia's most widespread and abundant lizards, the common dwarf skink is found across Australia. It is found west of the Great Dividing Range. It is not recorded to occur in north-east Northern Territory, Cape York Peninsula, southern Victoria or Tasmania, but it is known to occur in all other areas of Australia. The range of the common dwarf skink spans across approximately 93% of the continent. A continuous occurrence record map can be found online at "Atlas of Living Australia" through this reference link.

== Habitat ==
M. greyii is widespread and found in many different habitats. It is found in heaths, deserts, woodlands and grasslands. It is also frequently found in urban environments, and is therefore fairly well known. This skink is known to shelter underneath logs and rocks. It is often found moving through leaf litter on the ground while searching for its main food source of invertebrates. It is widespread on a variety of soil types.

== Description ==
M. greyii is a very small skink that grows up to 38–40 mm (1.5–1.6 in) in snout-to-vent length (SVL). The body is of light build and elongated. It has smooth scales and four limbs. The forelimbs have four digits and the hindlimbs have five digits. It is brownish grey to grey and has dorsal dashes that can form broken lines and broad dark upper lateral and white midlateral stripes. The underbelly of the skink is usually white. Breeding males can be distinguished as they have a yellow/orange flush on the underbelly as well as a pink flush on the throat. Some populations can differ slightly in colour because of the different environments they inhabit. The common dwarf skink has two supraciliary scales, the first is quite small and the second is contacting the supraocular scale. It has 3 scales in a line between the eye and the nostril.

== Behaviour ==
The common dwarf skink is fossorial, meaning it is a burrowing skink. This species is diurnal.

== Diet ==
Prey for the common dwarf skink includes small insects such as ants and termites, and also small spiders.

== As prey ==
Predators of the common dwarf skink include, but are not limited to, larger reptiles, avian species and cats.

== Reproduction ==
The adult female common dwarf skink may lay 1-3 eggs in every clutch.

M. greyii is one of a small number of vertebrate species that are known to reproduce by parthenogenesis. A 2007 study discovered that M. greyii is able to reproduce by parthenogenesis as well as by sexual reproduction. Mitochondrial DNA revealed that parthenogenesis is able to occur in this species. Parthenogenesis is when eggs can mature without being fertilised into clones of the female. This process can occur in some non-mammal species.
