= Menetia maini =

Conservation status
- Least Concern (IUCN 3.1)

Scientific classification
- Kingdom: Animalia
- Phylum: Chordata
- Class: Reptilia
- Order: Squamata
- Family: Scincidae
- Genus: Menetia
- Species: M. maini

Binomial name
- Menetia maini Storr, 1976

Synonyms
- Menetia zynja Ingram, 1977

Species of lizard

Menetia maini, also known commonly as Main's menetia, Main's dwarf skink, and the northern dwarf skink, is a species of skink in the subfamily Eugongylinae native to northern central Australia.

== Etymology ==
The specific name, maini, is in honor of Australian ecologist Albert "Bert" Russell Main.

== Description ==
A small species, Menetia maini may attain a snout-to-vent length (SVL) of 25 mm (0.98 in). Dorsally, it is coppery brown. It has three scales in a row between the nasal scale and the eye.

== Geographic range ==
Menetia maini is found in Northern Territory, Queensland, and Western Australia, Australia.

== Habitat ==
Menetia maini is found in a variety of habitats, including rocky areas, grassland, shrubland, and savanna.

== Diet ==
Menetia maini preys upon invertebrates.

== Reproduction ==
Menetia maini is oviparous.
