= Lucasium wombeyi =

Pilbara ground gecko

Conservation status
- Least Concern (IUCN 3.1)

Scientific classification
- Kingdom: Animalia
- Phylum: Chordata
- Class: Reptilia
- Order: Squamata
- Suborder: Gekkota
- Family: Diplodactylidae
- Genus: Lucasium
- Species: L. wombeyi

Binomial name
- Lucasium wombeyi (Storr, 1978)

Synonyms
- Diplodactylus wombeyi Storr, 1978; Lucasium wombeyi — P. Oliver, Hutchinson & Cooper, 2007

Species of lizard

The Pilbara ground gecko (Lucasium wombeyi) also known commonly as Wombey's gecko, is a species of lizard in the family Diplodactylidae. The species is endemic to Australia.

== Etymology ==
The specific name, wombeyi, is in honour of Australian herpetologist John C. Wombey.

== Geographic range ==
L. wombeyi is found in the Pilbara region, in the Australian state of Western Australia.

== Habitat ==
The preferred natural habitats of L. wombeyi are grassland and rocky areas.

== Reproduction ==
L. wombeyi is oviparous.
