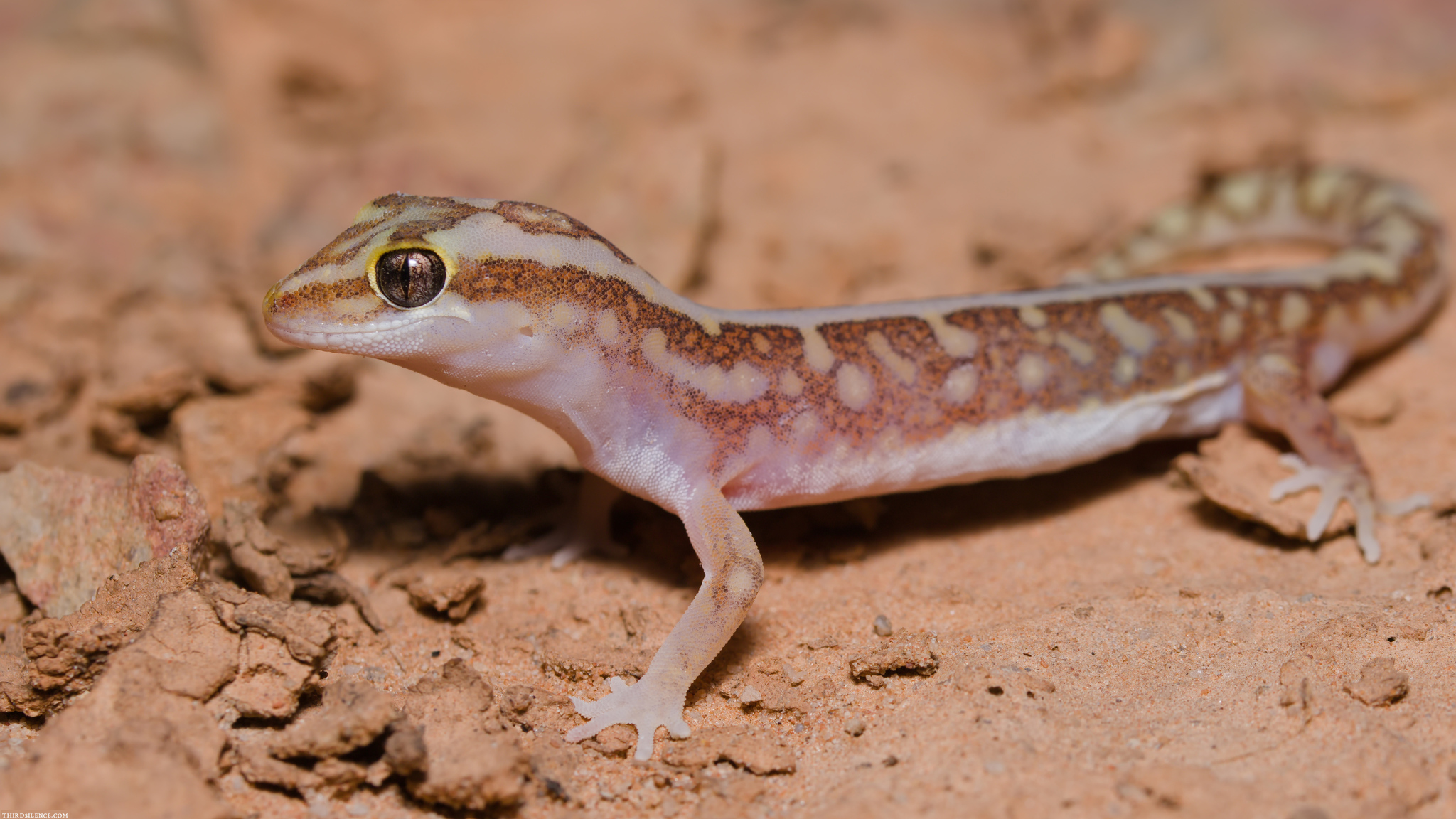

Conservation status
- Least Concern (IUCN 3.1)

Scientific classification
- Kingdom: Animalia
- Phylum: Chordata
- Class: Reptilia
- Order: Squamata
- Suborder: Gekkota
- Family: Diplodactylidae
- Genus: Lucasium
- Species: L. stenodactylum

Binomial name
- Lucasium stenodactylum (Boulenger, 1896)

Synonyms
- Diplodactylus stenodactylus Boulenger, 1896

= Lucasium stenodactylum =

Species of lizard

Lucasium stenodactylum (previously known as Diplodactylus stenodactylus), also known as the crowned gecko or pale-snouted ground gecko, is a species of gecko from Australia.

== Description ==
The colour of Lucasium stenodactylum varies from reddish brown to brown. The length of most individuals is approximately 90 mm (3.5 in). Body patterns also vary, although the species is typically found with a cream or white vertebral stripe. The stripe starts at each eye and joins at the back of the neck into a single vertebral stripe. In some individuals the vertebral stripe may be pale or absent. Large and small pale spots may be found on the limbs and sides of the body. Whitish under body. Tail is slender and comprises about 80 percent of snout-vent length. Homogeneous dorsal and flank scales.

== Distribution and habitat ==
L. stenodactylum is distributed in four separate locations in New South Wales, Australia: Sturt National Park, Mutawintji National Park and Thurloo Downs. The habitat of L. stenodactylum is not well known. In NSW, the species has been reported to be found in red and sandy soil habitats, as well as savannah woodlands and shrubby stony areas.

== Behaviour and ecology ==
The species is nocturnal and forages on insects.

== Taxonomy ==
To date there are three well-defined lineages (families) of geckos, the gekkonine geckos, diplodactyline geckos and pygopod legless lizards. However, the taxonomy of geckos and their families have recently been frequently revised. The species we know today as crowned gecko, Lucasium stenodactylum was described under the name of Diplodactylus stenodactylus as early as 1896 by Boulenger in the Annals and Magazine of Natural History. Boulenger described the specimen as “a new species... is allied to and appears to connect Diplodactylus Steindachneri, Blgr., and Cremodactylus damoeus, Lucas and Frost...”. Oliver et al. claimed that "Gekkos have a tendency to show high levels of cryptic diversity" and the diversity of the terrestrial genus Diplodactylus had been underestimated by a factor of two. The genus Lucasium Wermuth was originally described by Kluge in 1965. Until recently this genus, Lucasium Wermuth 1965, was mostly included in genus Diplodactylus Doughty and Hutchinson (2008). In 2006, Pepper, Doughty and Keogh generated the first molecular phylogeny for the Diplodactylus stenodactylus species group, that included D. alboguttatus, D. damaeus, D. maini, and D. squarrosus, D. stenodactylus, as well as numerous other groups. Analysis of the moleculary phylogeny results revealed "a deep and ancient phylogenetic split" within D. stenodactylus distinguishing populations in Pilbara regions from non-Pilbara populations. In 2007, Oliver, Hutchinson and Cooper, revived and revised the genus Lucasium to include D. byrnei, D. steindachneri and the stenodactylus groups.

== Conservation status ==
In New South Wales L. stenodactylum is classified as a vulnerable species according to the New South Wales Threatened Species Act 1995. In Queensland, there is no listing of an EPBC status (Environment Protection and Biodiversity Conservation Act 1999 EPBC Act); and the species has an NCA (Nature Conservation Act 1992) classification of ‘least concern’ (2). L. stenodacytlum also has a conservation status of ‘least concern’ within the Northern Territory. Threats to L. stenodacyltum include grazing from introduced animals and predation by foxes and cats. Also, the risk of extinction due to genetic effects and chance events (e.g. drought and fire) increases if populations become fragmented.
