= Menetia amaura =

Scientific classification
- Kingdom: Animalia
- Phylum: Chordata
- Class: Reptilia
- Order: Squamata
- Family: Scincidae
- Genus: Menetia
- Species: M. amaura

Binomial name
- Menetia amaura Storr, 1978

Species of lizard

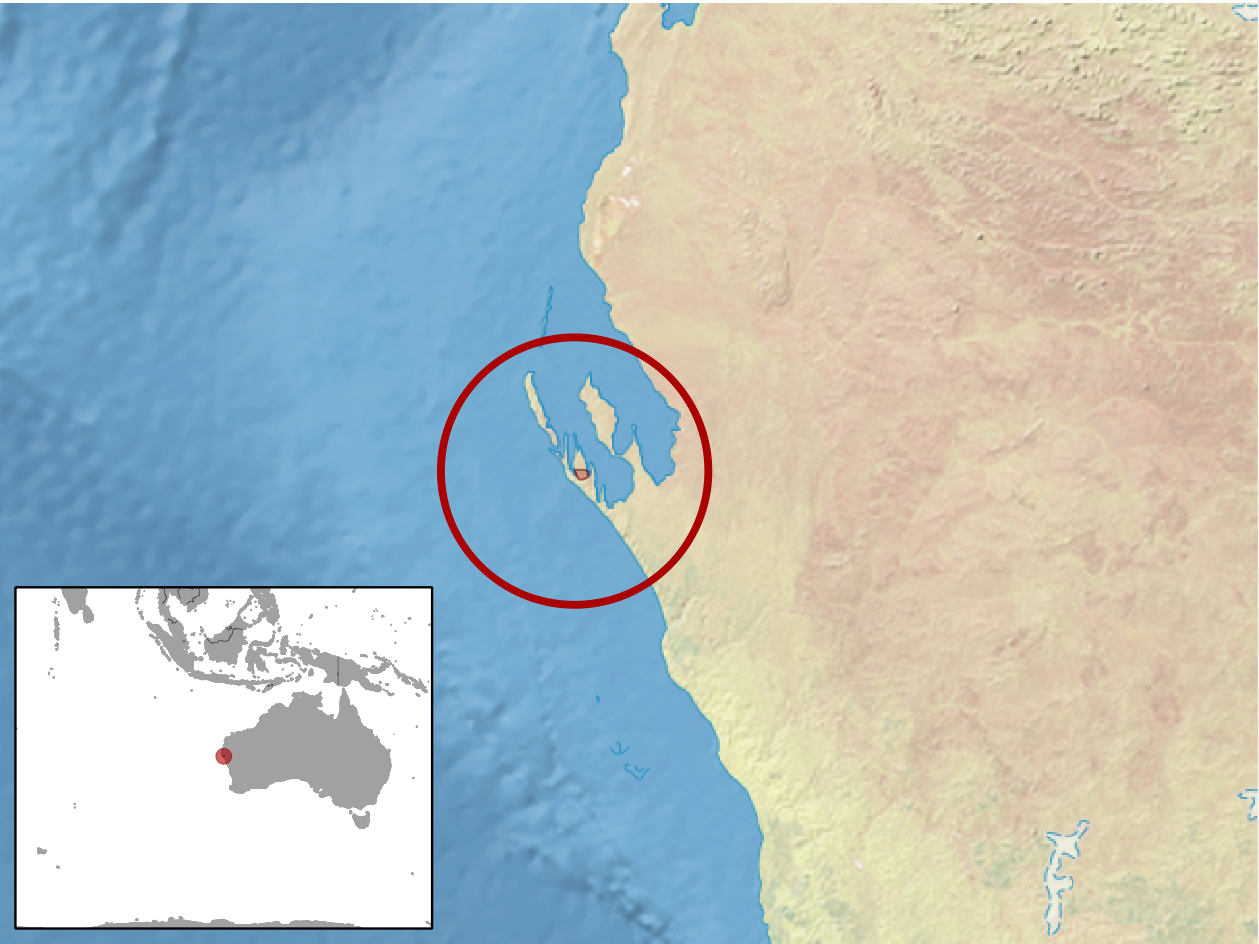
geographic distribution of Menetia amaura

Menetia amaura, common dwarf skink, is a species of skink found in Western Australia.
