= Bert Main =

Australian zoologist

Albert Russell Main CBE FAA FANZAAS (6 March 1919 – 3 December 2009) was an Australian zoologist.

Born in Perth, Western Australia, he studied zoology at The University of Western Australia. He served in the Australian Imperial Force and the Royal Australian Air Force during World War II, but later returned to zoology, qualifying as a Doctor of Philosophy in 1956, and becoming a Professor of Zoology in 1967.

He received many honours for his contribution to zoology including the Mueller Medal, the Gold Medal of the Australian Ecological Society, a CBE, the Centenary Medal, and a Royal Society of Western Australia Medal. He was elected a Fellow of the Australian Academy of Science in 1969.

He was married to arachnologist Barbara York Main.

Bert Main is commemorated in the scientific names of a two species of Australian lizards: Lucasium maini and Menetia maini. Commonly known as Main's frog, Ranoidea maini, is also named for him.
