= New Caledonian gecko =

New Caledonian gecko may refer to any of the below, all genera placed in the Diplodactylidae family and found in New Caledonia:

- Any of 12 species of geckos in the genus Bavayia
- Any of 9 species of geckos in the genus Dierogekko
- Paniegekko madjo, a species in a monotypic genus
