= Bavayia caillou =

Scientific classification
- Kingdom: Animalia
- Phylum: Chordata
- Class: Reptilia
- Order: Squamata
- Suborder: Gekkota
- Family: Diplodactylidae
- Genus: Bavayia
- Species: B. caillou

Binomial name
- Bavayia caillou Bauer, Sadlier, & Jackman, 2022

Species of lizard

Bavayia caillou is a species of geckos endemic to New Caledonia.

This species is believed to have a range restricted to approximately 400 sq km, reduced by clearance of land by burning for use in agriculture and forestry, and the range is threatened with further reduction by wildfires. Its habitat is at risk of degradation by deer and pigs that have been introduced, and the introduced electric ant (Wasmannia auropunctata) may both directly exclude the lizard from its habitat and affect the invertebrate fauna which it predates.

The species name refers to "le Grand Caillou", a colloquial name for New Caledonia.
