= Bavayia centralis =

Scientific classification
- Kingdom: Animalia
- Phylum: Chordata
- Class: Reptilia
- Order: Squamata
- Suborder: Gekkota
- Family: Diplodactylidae
- Genus: Bavayia
- Species: B. centralis

Binomial name
- Bavayia centralis Bauer, Sadlier, & Jackman, 2022

Species of lizard

Bavayia centralis is a species of geckos endemic to New Caledonia.

The range of Bavayia centralis is along the border between New Caledonia's South Province and North Province, with its remaining extent of occurrence estimated in 2022 at 400 sq km, reduced by historic habitat loss and at further risk from wildfires and nickel mining. The introduced electric ant (Wasmannia auropunctata) may both directly exclude the lizard from its habitat and affect the invertebrate fauna which it predates.

The species name references the Chaîne centrale mountain range of Grande Terre.
