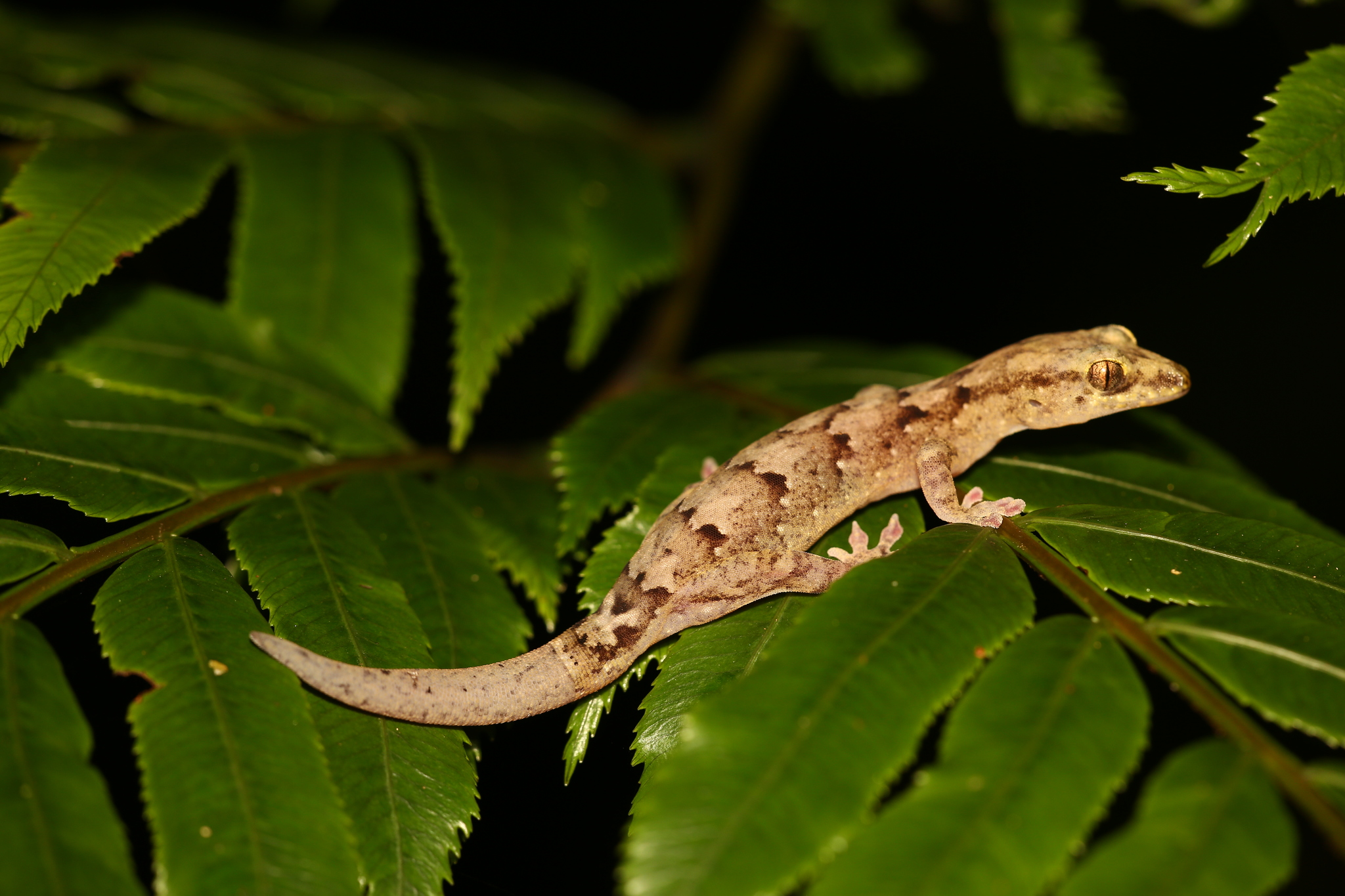

Conservation status
- Endangered (IUCN 3.1)

Scientific classification
- Kingdom: Animalia
- Phylum: Chordata
- Class: Reptilia
- Order: Squamata
- Suborder: Gekkota
- Family: Diplodactylidae
- Genus: Bavayia
- Species: B. sauvagii

Binomial name
- Bavayia sauvagii (Boulenger, 1883)

Synonyms
- Lepidodactylus sauvagii Boulenger, 1883; Bavayia sauvagei [sic] — Roux, 1913; Bavayia sauvagii — Sadlier, 1989

= Bavayia sauvagii =

Species of lizard

Bavayia sauvagii, also known commonly as Sauvage's bavayia and Sauvage's New Caledonian gecko, is a species of lizard in the family Diplodactylidae. The species is endemic to New Caledonia.

== Etymology ==
The specific name, sauvagii, is in honor of Henri Émile Sauvage, who was a French paleontologist, ichthyologist, and herpetologist.

== Geographic range ==
B. sauvagii is found on Grande Terre, Île des Pins, and Maré Island including their neighboring islets in New Caledonia.

== Habitat ==
The preferred natural habitats of B. sauvagii are forest and shrubland, at an altitude of 900 m (2,950 ft).

== Reproduction ==
B. sauvagii is oviparous.
