= Bavayia astrongatti =

Scientific classification
- Kingdom: Animalia
- Phylum: Chordata
- Class: Reptilia
- Order: Squamata
- Suborder: Gekkota
- Family: Diplodactylidae
- Genus: Bavayia
- Species: B. astrongatti

Binomial name
- Bavayia astrongatti Bauer, Sadlier, & Jackman, 2022

Species of lizard

Bavayia astrongatti is a species of geckos endemic to New Caledonia.

This species is endangered by habitat degradation and loss caused by wildfires, as well as the introduced electric ant (Wasmannia auropunctata), which may both directly exclude the lizard from its habitat and affect the invertebrate fauna which it predates.
