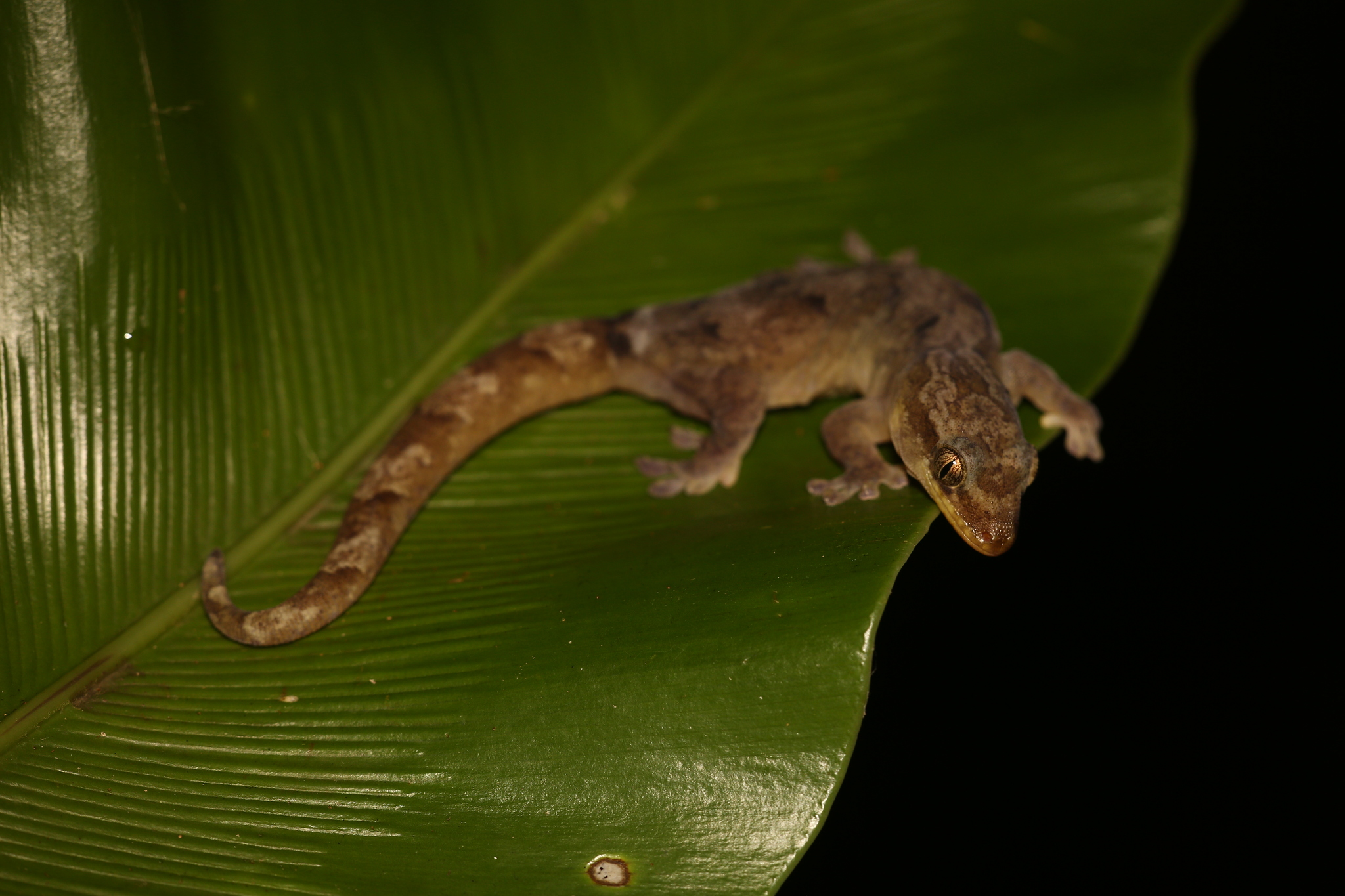

Conservation status
- Vulnerable (IUCN 3.1)

Scientific classification
- Kingdom: Animalia
- Phylum: Chordata
- Class: Reptilia
- Order: Squamata
- Suborder: Gekkota
- Family: Diplodactylidae
- Genus: Bavayia
- Species: B. crassicollis

Binomial name
- Bavayia crassicollis Roux, 1913

= Bavayia crassicollis =

Species of lizard

Bavayia crassicollis, also known as the strand bavayia, is a gecko endemic to the Loyalty Islands in New Caledonia.

The habitat and range of this species are thought to have been reduced by clearance of land for human habitation and agricultural use, which poses an ongoing threat. Introduced species are thought to have decreased its population through predation, and the introduced electric ant (Wasmannia auropunctata) may both directly exclude the lizard from its habitat and affect the invertebrate fauna which it predates.
