= Bavayia endemia =

Scientific classification
- Kingdom: Animalia
- Phylum: Chordata
- Class: Reptilia
- Order: Squamata
- Suborder: Gekkota
- Family: Diplodactylidae
- Genus: Bavayia
- Species: B. endemia

Binomial name
- Bavayia endemia Bauer, Sadlier, & Jackman, 2022

Species of lizard

Bavayia endemia is a species of gecko endemic to New Caledonia.

At the time of its description, B. endemia was considered to meet the IUCN Red List criteria for a "Near Threatened" species. As a result of probably past habitat loss and degradation, the total remaining area of occurrence for the species is estimated at 250 sq km. The remaining habitat is at risk of degradation by deer and pigs that have been introduced, and the introduced electric ant (Wasmannia auropunctata) may both directly exclude the lizard from its habitat and affect the invertebrate fauna which it predates.

The specific name references Endemia, the local Red List Authority within the Species Conservation Commission of the IUCN for assessing New Caledonian flora.
