= Bavayia boulinda =

Scientific classification
- Kingdom: Animalia
- Phylum: Chordata
- Class: Reptilia
- Order: Squamata
- Suborder: Gekkota
- Family: Diplodactylidae
- Genus: Bavayia
- Species: B. boulinda

Binomial name
- Bavayia boulinda Bauer, Sadlier, & Jackman, 2022

Species of lizard

Bavayia boulinda is a species of geckos endemic to New Caledonia.

There are two known populations of this species, found on elevated ultramafic landscapes near the summits of massifs on the island of Grande Terre, and separated by a distance of about 12 km. This habitat is at risk from wildfires and nickel mining. Its habitat is also at risk of degradation by deer and pigs that have been introduced, and the introduced electric ant (Wasmannia auropunctata) may both directly exclude the lizard from its habitat and affect the invertebrate fauna which it predates.

The species is named after the Massif du Boulinda.
