= Bavayia campestris =

Scientific classification
- Kingdom: Animalia
- Phylum: Chordata
- Class: Reptilia
- Order: Squamata
- Suborder: Gekkota
- Family: Diplodactylidae
- Genus: Bavayia
- Species: B. campestris

Binomial name
- Bavayia campestris Bauer, Sadlier, & Jackman, 2022

Species of lizard

Bavayia campestris is a species of geckos endemic to New Caledonia.

This species is endangered by habitat degradation and loss caused by wildfires and nickel mining, and is affected by cats, which may directly predate it, as well as the introduced electric ant (Wasmannia auropunctata), which may both directly exclude the lizard from its habitat and affect the invertebrate fauna which it predates.
