= Bavayia pulchella =

Conservation status
- Endangered (IUCN 3.1)

Scientific classification
- Kingdom: Animalia
- Phylum: Chordata
- Class: Reptilia
- Order: Squamata
- Suborder: Gekkota
- Family: Diplodactylidae
- Genus: Bavayia
- Species: B. pulchella

Binomial name
- Bavayia pulchella Bauer, Whitaker, & Sadlier, 1998

Species of lizard

Bavayia pulchella, also known as the pretty bavayia, is a species of geckos endemic to Grande Terre in New Caledonia.

The species name, pulchella, is a diminutive of the Latin for "beautiful", and according to the species description "refers to both the small size of this species and the complex and attractive dorsal pattern exhibited by most specimens, including the holotype."
