= Bavayia goroensis =

Conservation status
- Endangered (IUCN 3.1)

Scientific classification
- Kingdom: Animalia
- Phylum: Chordata
- Class: Reptilia
- Order: Squamata
- Suborder: Gekkota
- Family: Diplodactylidae
- Genus: Bavayia
- Species: B. goroensis

Binomial name
- Bavayia goroensis Bauer, Jackman, Sadlier, Shea, & Whitaker, 2008

Species of lizard

Bavayia goroensis is a species of geckos endemic to southeastern Grande Terre in New Caledonia.
