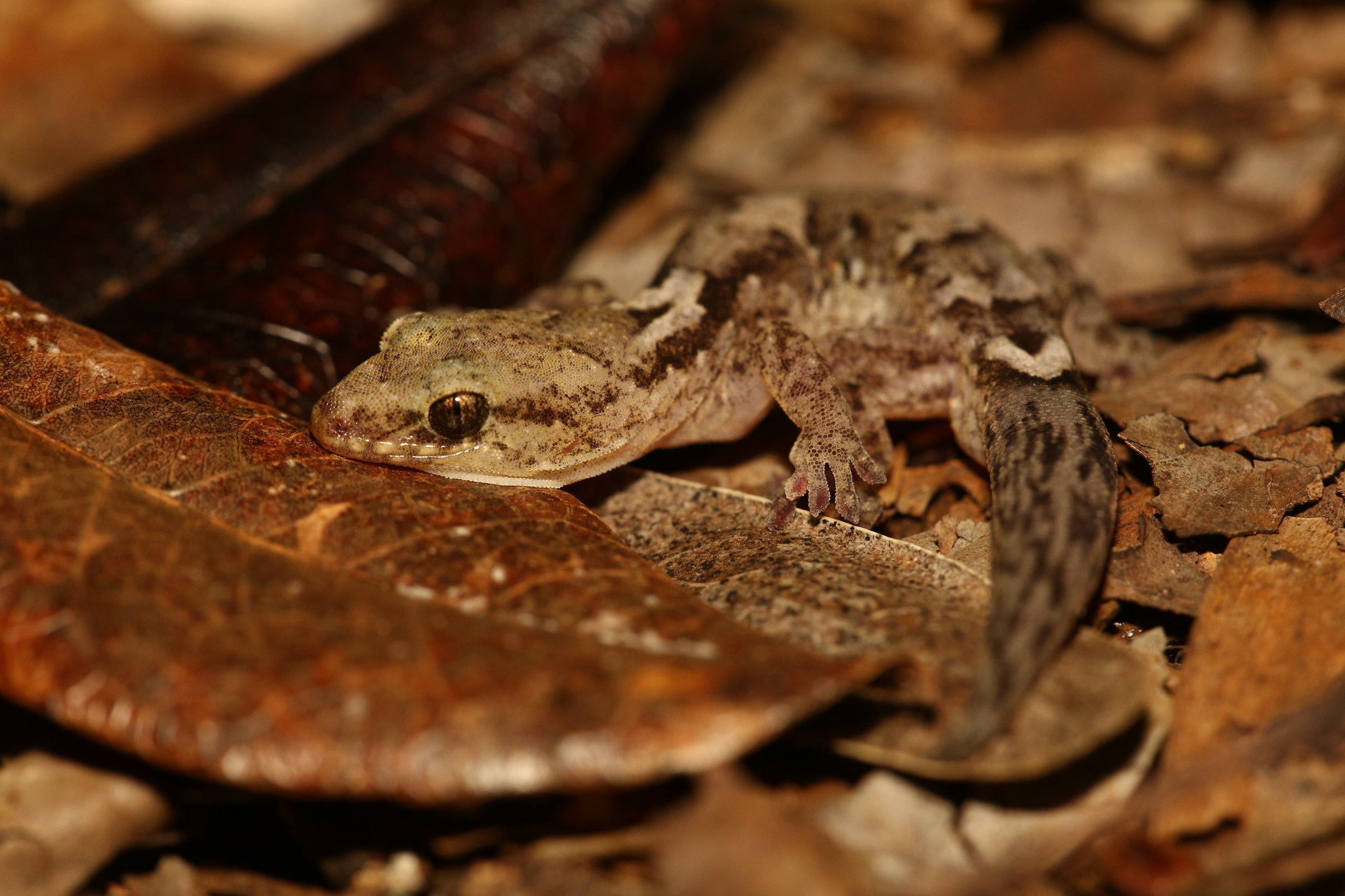

Conservation status
- Critically Endangered (IUCN 3.1)

Scientific classification
- Kingdom: Animalia
- Phylum: Chordata
- Class: Reptilia
- Order: Squamata
- Suborder: Gekkota
- Family: Diplodactylidae
- Genus: Bavayia
- Species: B. exsuccida

Binomial name
- Bavayia exsuccida Bauer, A. Whitaker & Sadlier, 1998

= Bavayia exsuccida =

Species of lizard

Bavayia exsuccida, also known as the sclerophyll bavayia, is a species of geckos endemic to North Province, New Caledonia. As of 2022, it is known from only one locality, with an extent of occurrence of 8 km^{2} (3.1 sq mi).

The species name exsuccida derives from the Latin exsuccus, meaning "without juice" or "without sap", and refers the sclerophyll vegetation of the dry forests in which this species is found.
