= Bavayia ornata =

Conservation status
- Critically Endangered (IUCN 3.1)

Scientific classification
- Kingdom: Animalia
- Phylum: Chordata
- Class: Reptilia
- Order: Squamata
- Suborder: Gekkota
- Family: Diplodactylidae
- Genus: Bavayia
- Species: B. ornata

Binomial name
- Bavayia ornata Roux, 1913

Species of lizard

Bavayia ornata, also known as the ornate bavayia, is a gecko endemic to mountain ranges of Grande Terre in New Caledonia.
