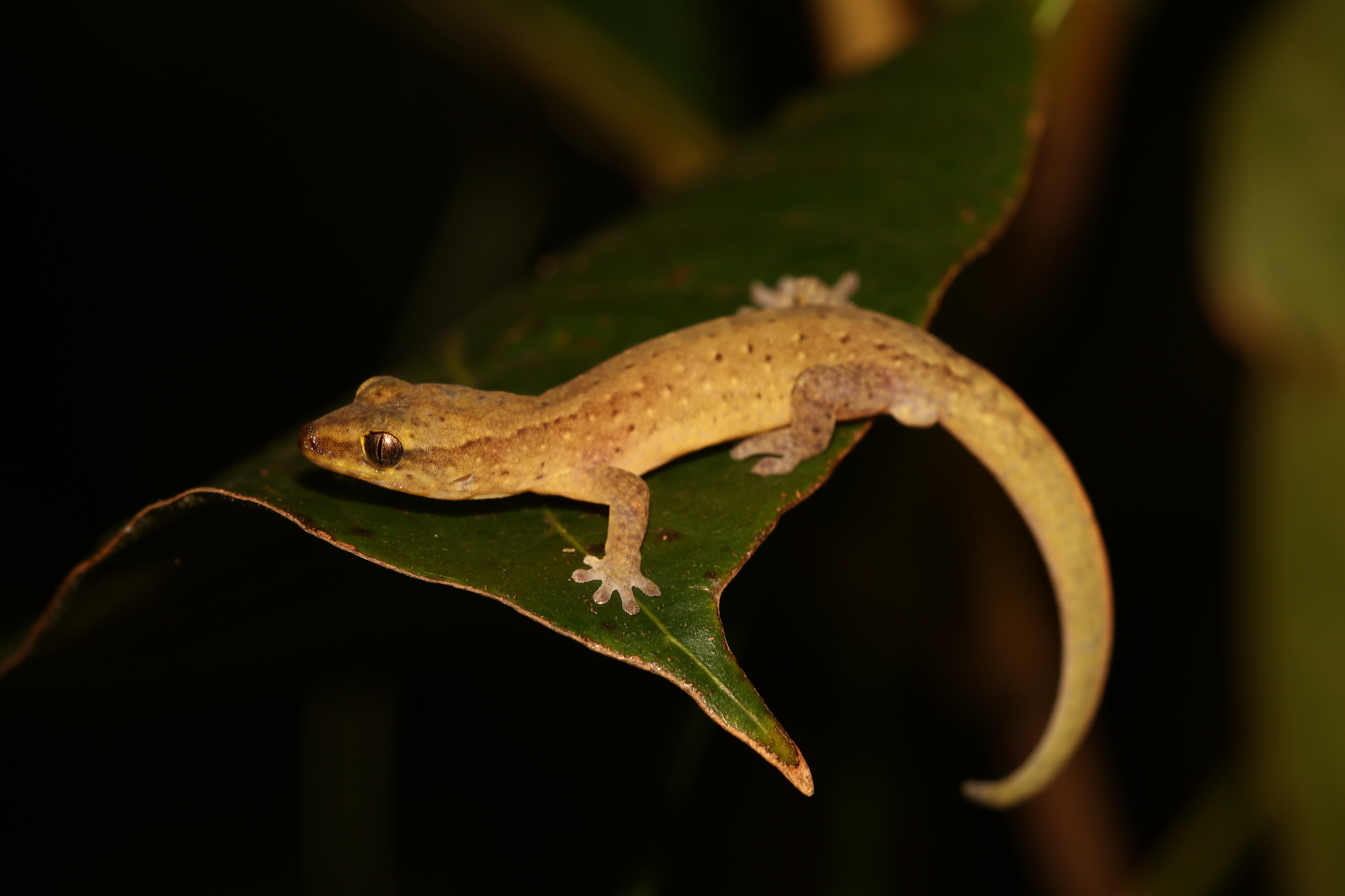
- Bavayia septuiclavis

Scientific classification
- Kingdom: Animalia
- Phylum: Chordata
- Class: Reptilia
- Order: Squamata
- Suborder: Gekkota
- Family: Diplodactylidae
- Genus: Bavayia; Roux, 1913

= Bavayia =

Genus of lizards

Bavayia is a genus of lizards in the family Diplodactylidae. Species in the genus Bavayia are also known commonly as New Caledonian geckos or bavayias. The genus is native to the remote New Caledonia and Loyalty Islands. The 41 species are moderately small to medium-sized geckos, and are distinguished from other genera by their tail length and the shape of their digits.

== Etymology ==
The generic name, Bavayia, is in honor of Arthur Bavay, a French pharmacist and herpetologist.

== Description ==
All species of Bavayia have elongated digits, with each claw on the edge of each seta. They are fairly drab in coloration.

== Behavior ==
Bavayia species are nocturnal, and spend the daylight hours hiding under bark or rocks, or in tree holes.

== Species ==
These 41 described species are recognized as being valid:

- Bavayia ashleyi Bauer, Sadlier, & Jackman, 2022
- Bavayia astrongatti Bauer, Sadlier, & Jackman, 2022
- Bavayia borealis Bauer, Sadlier, & Jackman, 2022
- Bavayia boulinda Bauer, Sadlier, & Jackman, 2022
- Bavayia caillou Bauer, Sadlier, & Jackman, 2022
- Bavayia campestris Bauer, Sadlier, & Jackman, 2022
- Bavayia centralis Bauer, Sadlier, & Jackman, 2022
- Bavayia cocoensis Bauer, Sadlier, & Jackman, 2022
- Bavayia crassicollis Roux, 1913 – strand bavayia
- Bavayia cyclura (Günther, 1872) – Günther's New Caledonian gecko
- Bavayia endemia Bauer, Sadlier, & Jackman, 2022
- Bavayia exsuccida Bauer, A. Whitaker & Sadlier, 1998 – Sclerophyll bavayia
- Bavayia geitaina J.L. Wright, Bauer & Sadlier, 2000 – gracile bavayia
- Bavayia goroensis Bauer, Jackman, Sadlier, Shea & A. Whitaker, 2008
- Bavayia insularis Bauer, Sadlier, & Jackman, 2022
- Bavayia jourdani Bauer, Sadlier, & Jackman, 2022
- Bavayia kanaky Bauer, Sadlier, & Jackman, 2022
- Bavayia koniambo Bauer, Sadlier, & Jackman, 2022
- Bavayia kopeto Bauer, Sadlier, & Jackman, 2022
- Bavayia kunyie Bauer, Sadlier, & Jackman, 2022
- Bavayia lepredourensis Bauer, Sadlier, & Jackman, 2022
- Bavayia loyaltiensis Bauer, Telma, & Sadlier, 2022
- Bavayia mandjeliensis Bauer, Sadlier, & Jackman, 2022
- Bavayia menazi Bauer, Sadlier, & Jackman, 2022
- Bavayia montana Roux, 1913 – mountain New Caledonian gecko
- Bavayia nehoueensis Bauer, Sadlier, & Jackman, 2022
- Bavayia nubila Bauer, Sadlier, Jackman & Shea, 2012
- Bavayia occidentalis Bauer, Sadlier, & Jackman, 2022
- Bavayia ornata Roux, 1913 – ornate bavayia
- Bavayia periclitata Bauer, Sadlier, & Jackman, 2022
- Bavayia pulchella Bauer, A. Whitaker & Sadlier, 1998 – pretty bavayia
- Bavayia renevierorum Bauer, Sadlier, & Jackman, 2022
- Bavayia rhizophora Bauer, Sadlier, & Jackman, 2022
- Bavayia robusta J.L. Wright, Bauer & Sadlier, 2000 – robust forest bavayia
- Bavayia sauvagii (Boulenger, 1883) – Sauvage's New Caledonian gecko
- Bavayia septuiclavis Sadlier, 1989 – Sadlier's New Caledonian gecko
- Bavayia stephenparki Bauer, Sadlier, & Jackman, 2022
- Bavayia tanleensis Bauer, Sadlier, & Jackman, 2022
- Bavayia tchingou Bauer, Sadlier, & Jackman, 2022
- Bavayia ultramaficola Bauer, Sadlier, & Jackman, 2022
- Bavayia whitakeri Bauer, Sadlier, & Jackman, 2022

Nota bene: A binomial authority in parentheses indicates that the species was originally described in a genus other than Bavayia.

== Taxonomy ==
The species formerly known as Bavayia madjo is now known as Paniegekko madjo.

The species formerly known as Bavayia validiclavis is now known as Dierogekko validiclavis.
