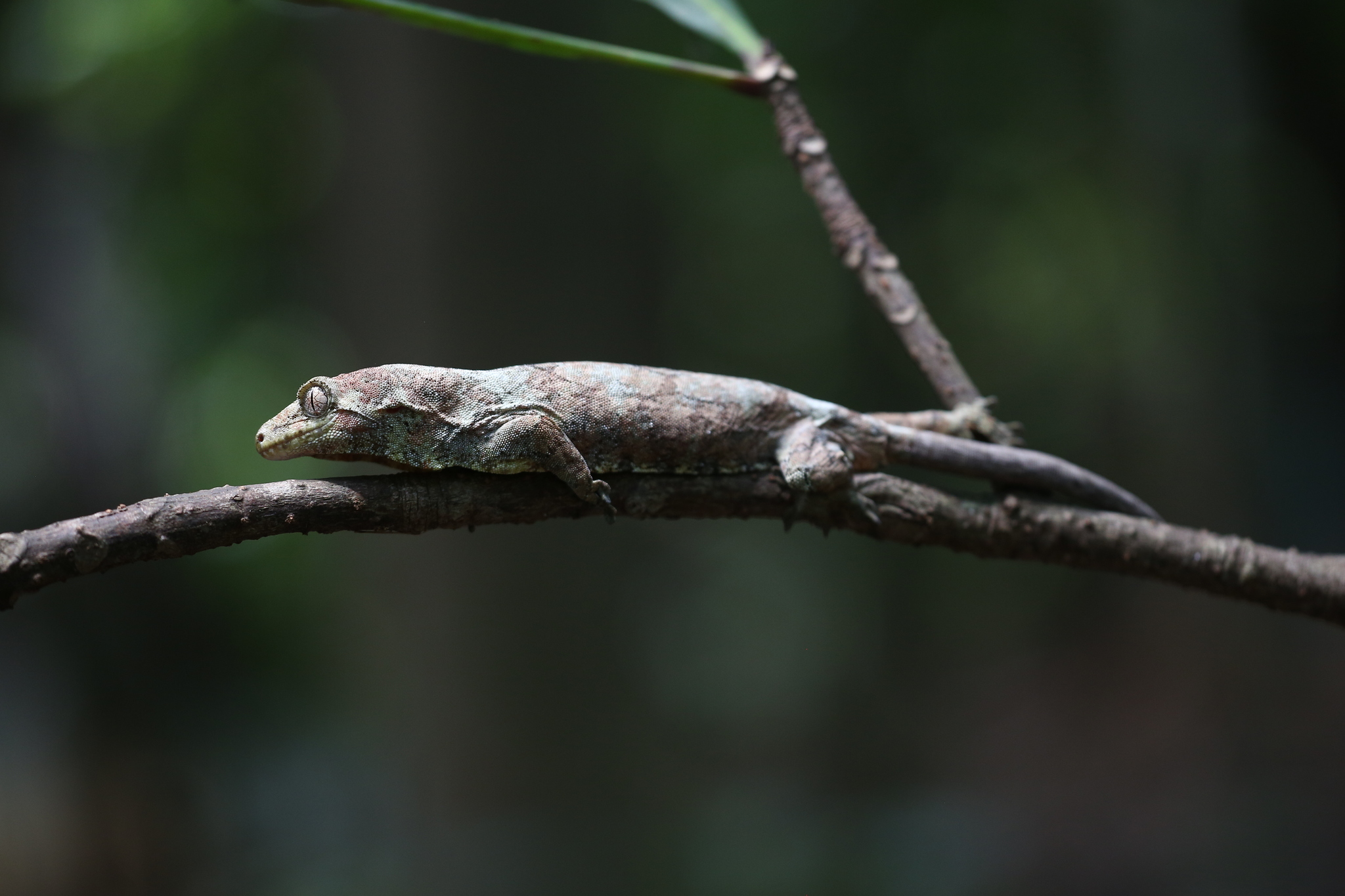

Conservation status
- Endangered (IUCN 3.1)

Scientific classification
- Kingdom: Animalia
- Phylum: Chordata
- Class: Reptilia
- Order: Squamata
- Suborder: Gekkota
- Family: Diplodactylidae
- Genus: Mniarogekko
- Species: M. jalu

Binomial name
- Mniarogekko jalu Bauer, A. Whitaker & Sadlier, & Jackman, 2012

= Mniarogekko jalu =

Species of lizard

Mniarogekko jalu is a species of geckos endemic to North Province, New Caledonia.
