= Bavayia geitaina =

Conservation status
- Near Threatened (IUCN 3.1)

Scientific classification
- Kingdom: Animalia
- Phylum: Chordata
- Class: Reptilia
- Order: Squamata
- Suborder: Gekkota
- Family: Diplodactylidae
- Genus: Bavayia
- Species: B. geitaina

Binomial name
- Bavayia geitaina J.L. Wright, Bauer, & Sadlier, 2000

Species of lizard

Bavayia geitaina, also known as the gracile bavayia, is a species of geckos endemic to southern Grande Terre in New Caledonia.
