= Bavayia ashleyi =

Scientific classification
- Kingdom: Animalia
- Phylum: Chordata
- Class: Reptilia
- Order: Squamata
- Suborder: Gekkota
- Family: Diplodactylidae
- Genus: Bavayia
- Species: B. ashleyi

Binomial name
- Bavayia ashleyi Bauer, Sadlier, & Jackman, 2022

Species of lizard

Bavayia ashleyi is a species of geckos endemic to New Caledonia.

There are two known populations of this species, on the island of Grande Terre, with a total remaining area of occurrence estimated at 50 sq km. This habitat is at risk from wildfires and nickel mining. Its habitat is also at risk of degradation by deer and pigs that have been introduced.
