= Bavayia cocoensis =

Scientific classification
- Kingdom: Animalia
- Phylum: Chordata
- Class: Reptilia
- Order: Squamata
- Suborder: Gekkota
- Family: Diplodactylidae
- Genus: Bavayia
- Species: B. cocoensis

Binomial name
- Bavayia cocoensis Bauer, Sadlier, & Jackman, 2022

Species of lizard

Bavayia cocoensis is a species of geckos endemic to New Caledonia.

At the time of its description in 2022 this species was only known from one area of the Koniambo Massif with an area of 2 km^{2}, and was considered to meet the IUCN Red List criteria for being Critically Endangered.
