= Bavayia lepredourensis =

Scientific classification
- Kingdom: Animalia
- Phylum: Chordata
- Class: Reptilia
- Order: Squamata
- Suborder: Gekkota
- Family: Diplodactylidae
- Genus: Bavayia
- Species: B. lepredourensis

Binomial name
- Bavayia lepredourensis Bauer, Sadlier, & Jackman, 2022

Species of lizard

Bavayia lepredourensis is a species of geckos endemic to New Caledonia.
