= Strophurus spinula =

Scientific classification
- Kingdom: Animalia
- Phylum: Chordata
- Class: Reptilia
- Order: Squamata
- Suborder: Gekkota
- Family: Diplodactylidae
- Genus: Strophurus
- Species: S. spinula

Binomial name
- Strophurus spinula Sadlier, Beatson, Brennan & Bauer, 2023

Species of lizard

Strophurus spinula, commonly known as the lesser thorn-tailed gecko, is a species of lizard in the family Diplodactylidae. It is endemic to Australia.

== Taxonomy ==
The specific name spinula is Latin for 'little thorn', referring to the fact that its tail spines are comparatively small (a feature distinguishing it from the Goldfields spiny-tailed gecko).

The lesser thorn-tailed gecko was originally assigned as a population of Strophurus assimilis (the Goldfields spiny-tailed gecko). However, a 2023 study using molecular evidence has found it to be a distinct parapatric species, thus it was described as a new species Strophurus spinula.

== Description ==
The lesser thorn-tailed gecko reaches a snout-vent length of 40.8 to 61.2 mm, with the tail being 47.8 to 64.8% of the SVL. Their body color is mostly grey, with darker markings on the dorsal surface and a wavy pattern on the dorsolateral edge. Enlarged tubercles are arranged in a pair of parallel lines running down dorsal surface on either side of the dorsal mid-line, often broken at regular intervals of length. In live specimens, the iris shows reticulated patterns and is surrounded by an orange-brown ring of color.

== Distribution and habitat ==
S. spinula is found in the southern areas of Western Australia. It mostly occurs in Mulga woodland, also appearing in mallee and shrublands with acacia & eucalyptus. One specimen was collected recorded from a saline alluvial plain with scattered haplophytic shrubland in Rosemont.
