= Bavayia nubila =

Scientific classification
- Kingdom: Animalia
- Phylum: Chordata
- Class: Reptilia
- Order: Squamata
- Suborder: Gekkota
- Family: Diplodactylidae
- Genus: Bavayia
- Species: B. nubila

Binomial name
- Bavayia nubila Bauer, Sadlier, Jackman, & Shea, 2012

Species of lizard

Bavayia nubila is a species of geckos endemic to Grande Terre in New Caledonia.
