= Bavayia montana =

Conservation status
- Endangered (IUCN 3.1)

Scientific classification
- Kingdom: Animalia
- Phylum: Chordata
- Class: Reptilia
- Order: Squamata
- Suborder: Gekkota
- Family: Diplodactylidae
- Genus: Bavayia
- Species: B. montana

Binomial name
- Bavayia montana Roux, 1913

Species of lizard

Bavayia montana, also known as the mountain New Caledonian gecko or montane bavayia, is a gecko endemic to the main mountain ranges of Grande Terre in New Caledonia.

== Threats ==
Population is in decline primarily due to habitat loss and habitat degradation caused by expanded nickel mining operations.
