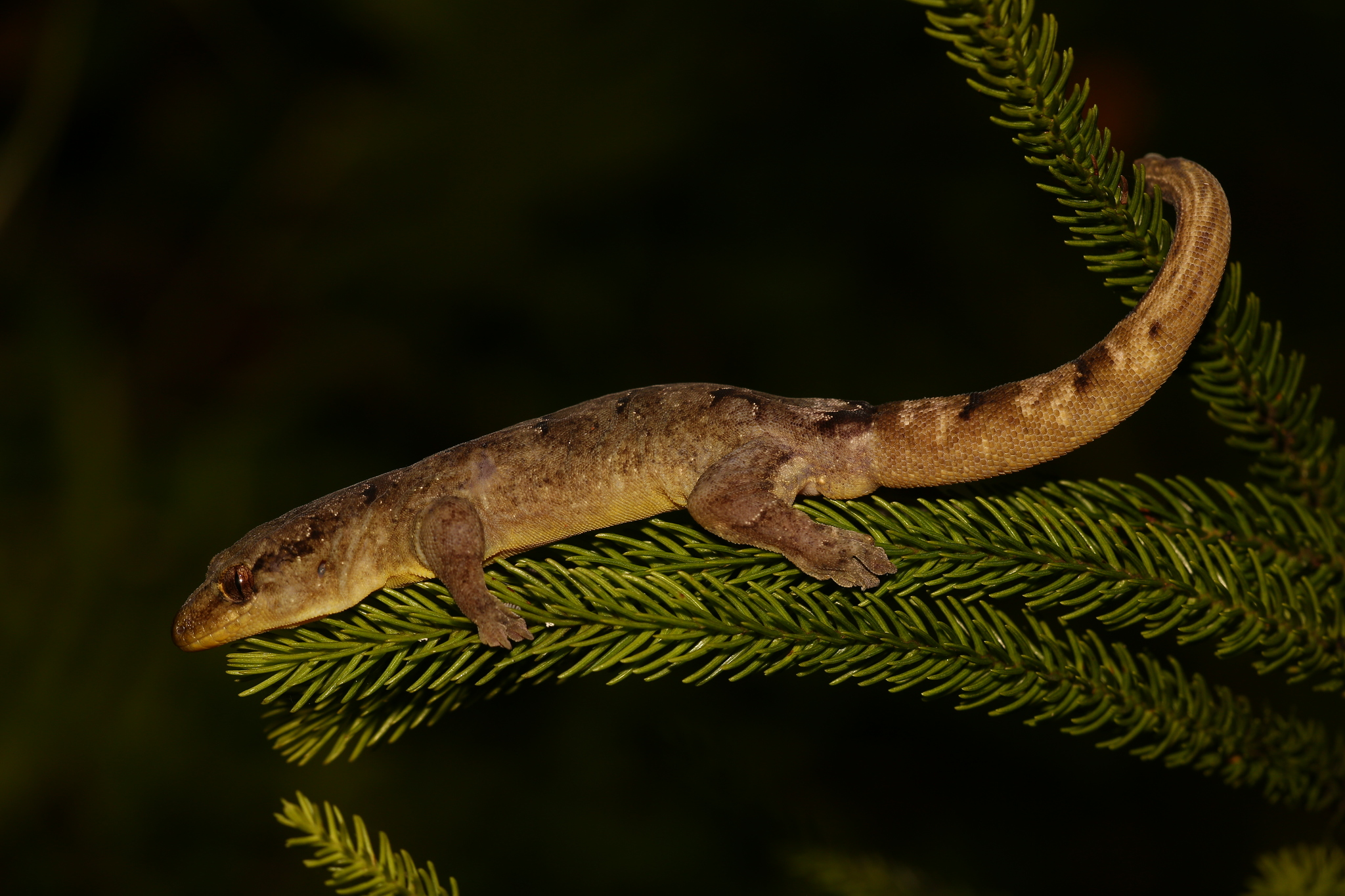

Conservation status
- Near Threatened (IUCN 3.1)

Scientific classification
- Kingdom: Animalia
- Phylum: Chordata
- Class: Reptilia
- Order: Squamata
- Suborder: Gekkota
- Family: Diplodactylidae
- Genus: Bavayia
- Species: B. robusta

Binomial name
- Bavayia robusta Wright, Bauer, & Sadlier, 2000

= Bavayia robusta =

Species of lizard

Bavayia robusta, also known as the robust forest bavayia, is a species of geckos endemic to Grande Terre and Île des Pins in New Caledonia. It belongs to the family Diplodactylidae and is the largest known species in the Bavayia genus.

== Description ==
Bavayia robusta, typically reaches a total length of 15–20 cm (6–7 inches). This species is named for its relatively robust build, with a stockier body and broader head compared to other members of the genus. Its limbs are well-developed, and the toes are equipped with expanded pads that aid in climbing. It has a long tail, which serves both as a counterbalance during climbing and as a form of communication between other individuals of the same species. As with many geckos, B. robusta is also capable of autotomy—shedding its tail as a defense mechanism against predators.

The coloration of B. robusta generally ranges from brown to more greyish-brown, often with irregular darker markings or faint banding along the back and tail, providing effective camouflage in its forest habitat. The ventral side (underside) is typically lighter, and the eyes are large, with vertical pupils adapted for nocturnal activity. Its skin texture is relatively smooth, with small granular scales covering most of the body, and larger scales present on the tail and flanks.

== Distribution and habitat ==
This species inhabits a variety of wooded areas, including mangroves, coastal forests, and humid forests at low to mid-elevations.

It is found mainly along the west coast of Grande Terre, though there are other populations scattered in suitable habitats across the island. Additionally, B. robusta is present on Île des Pins and a few surrounding islands.

== Ecology ==
=== Behavior ===
Bavayia robusta is a nocturnal and primarily arboreal gecko, being mostly active during the night and spending most of its time on higher surfaces, typically on trees and shrubs. During the daytime, it seeks shelter in tree bark crevices, under leaf litter, or within rocky outcrops to avoid predators and desiccation. Due to its slim build, it is able to hide in hard to reach places, making it even harder to detect. B. robusta is an agile and fast-moving gecko, capable of quick bursts of speed both on the ground and while climbing. It is also quite alert and responsive to disturbances, often retreating rapidly when approached.

Like many other gecko species, B. robusta is able to drop its tail (autotomy) when threatened, allowing it to escape by distracting the predators. The tail can regenerate over time, although the new tail often differs slightly in shape and color. Although Bavayia robusta possesses the ability to shed its tail, it appears to do so less frequently than some other gecko species native to New Caledonia.

=== Diet ===
Bavayia robusta- is an omnivorous species, although it primarily feeds on insects and other small invertebrates. It may occasionally consume other organic material such as fruit, nectar, and pollen.

=== Reproduction ===
Bavayia robusta is oviparous, meaning it reproduces by laying eggs. Females typically lay a clutch of two eggs, which is common among New Caledonian geckos. These eggs are usually laid in moist sheltered areas, such as under bark or leaf litter, where they are protected from predators and desiccation.
