= Oedodera =

Conservation status
- Endangered (IUCN 3.1)

Scientific classification
- Kingdom: Animalia
- Phylum: Chordata
- Class: Reptilia
- Order: Squamata
- Suborder: Gekkota
- Family: Diplodactylidae
- Genus: Oedodera; Bauer, Jackman, Sadlier, & A. Whitaker, 2006
- Species: O. marmorata

Binomial name
- Oedodera marmorata Bauer, Jackman, Sadlier, & Whitaker, 2006

Genus of lizards

Oedodera marmorata, also known as the marbled gecko, is a species of gecko endemic to New Caledonia.
