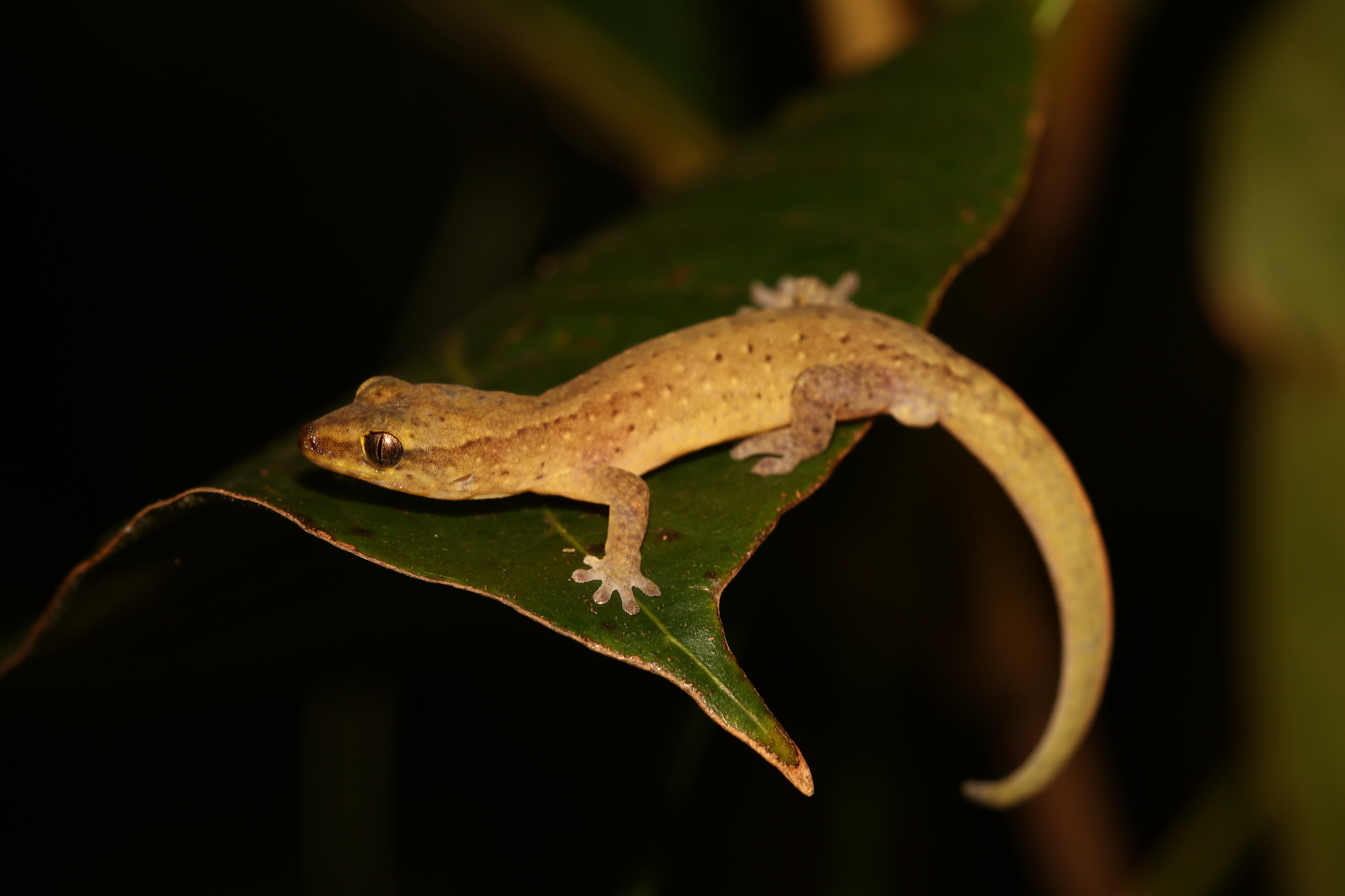

Conservation status
- Near Threatened (IUCN 3.1)

Scientific classification
- Kingdom: Animalia
- Phylum: Chordata
- Class: Reptilia
- Order: Squamata
- Suborder: Gekkota
- Family: Diplodactylidae
- Genus: Bavayia
- Species: B. septuiclavis

Binomial name
- Bavayia septuiclavis Sadlier, 1989

= Bavayia septuiclavis =

Species of lizard

Bavayia septuiclavis, also known as Sadlier's New Caledonian gecko or the pale-stripe bavayia, is a gecko endemic to southern Grande Terre in New Caledonia.
