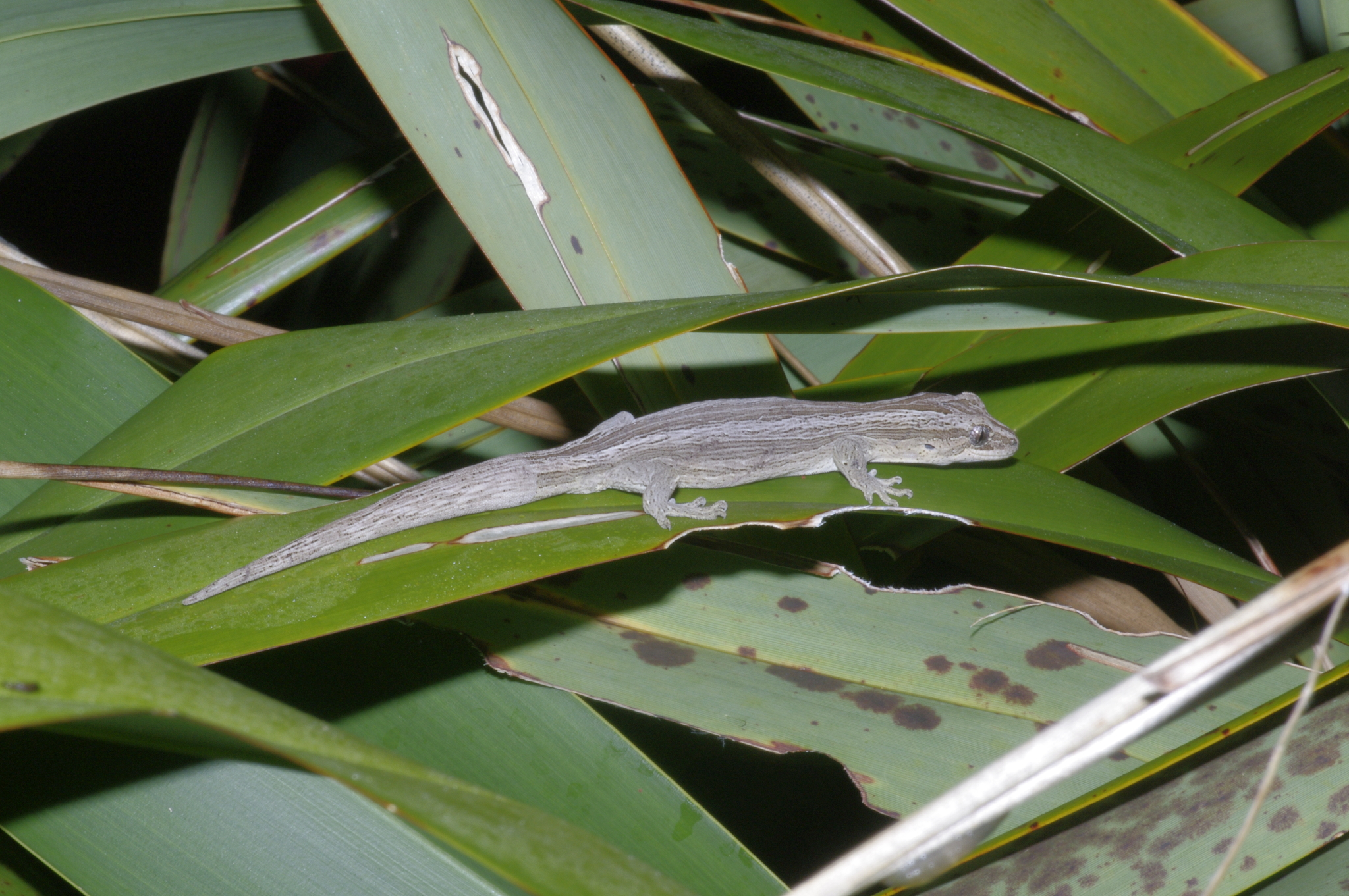
- Stephen's Island gecko on Maud Island in the Marlborough Sounds

Conservation status
- Endangered (IUCN 3.1)

Scientific classification
- Kingdom: Animalia
- Phylum: Chordata
- Class: Reptilia
- Order: Squamata
- Suborder: Gekkota
- Family: Diplodactylidae
- Genus: Toropuku
- Species: T. stephensi

Binomial name
- Toropuku stephensi (Robb, 1980)
- Distribution of the Stephen's Island gecko on a map of the South Island Known native range

Synonyms
- Hoplodactylus stephensi Robb, 1980; Toropuku stephensi — Nielsen et al., 2011

= Stephen's Island gecko =

Species of reptile

The Stephen's Island gecko (Toropuku stephensi), also known commonly as the Cook Strait striped gecko, Stephen's sticky-toed gecko, and the striped gecko, is a species of gecko in the genus Toropuku in the family Diplodactylidae. The species is endemic to New Zealand.

== Taxonomy and etymology ==
The holotype of T. stephensi is in the collection of the Museum of New Zealand Te Papa Tongarewa.The genus name, Toropuku, derives from the Māori word for "secret" or "stealthy". The specific name, stephensi, refers to Stephens Island, New Zealand. Toropuku was believed to be a monotypic genus until the 2020 description of Toropuku inexpectatus.

== Habitat ==
The preferred natural habitats of T. stephensi are coastal forest and shrubland, at altitudes from sea level to 225 m (738 ft). T. stephensi is known from several small islands in the Cook Strait between North Island and South Island of New Zealand. It was first described from Stephens Island, and occurs in higher densities on Maud Island. In 2019, a population was also established on Puangiangi Island. A discontinuous population found in the Coromandel Peninsula of North Island was given its own species, T. inexpectatus, in 2020.

== Reproduction ==
T. stephensi is viviparous and has a low reproductive rate, with females giving birth to 1-2 young every other year. Sexual maturity is estimated to be at six years, and total life expectancy exceeds 16 years.

== Conservation status ==
As of 2012 the Department of Conservation (DOC) classified the Stephen's Island gecko as Nationally Vulnerable under the New Zealand Threat Classification System.

The IUCN lists T. stephensi as endangered, as it occupies limited areas at a small population density. Mainland populations in particular (now T. inexpectatus) are under pressure from introduced cats, rodents, and stoats. Urban development and a higher density of cats intensifies this pressure near the town of Coromandel. In 2020, T. stephensi was split into two species, with the Coromandel peninsula populations placed into T. inexpectatus. A re-evaluation of T. stephensi's conservation status is necessary, as the species is now believed to be restricted to the three islands in the Cook Strait. Despite the small area occupied by the Cook Strait island populations, they seem to be stable and protected from introduced predators, as the islands are nature reserves which can only be accessed by permit.
