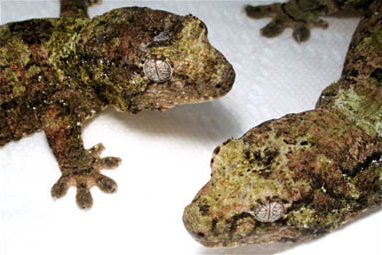
- Mniarogekko chahoua

Scientific classification
- Kingdom: Animalia
- Phylum: Chordata
- Class: Reptilia
- Order: Squamata
- Suborder: Gekkota
- Family: Diplodactylidae
- Genus: Mniarogekko; Bauer, A. Whitaker, Sadlier, & Jackman, 2012

= Mniarogekko =

Genus of lizards

Mniarogekko is a genus of lizards in the family Diplodactylidae endemic to New Caledonia. It includes two species:

- Mniarogekko chahoua (Bavay, 1869)
- Mniarogekko jalu Bauer, A. Whitaker, Sadlier, & Jackman, 2012
