= Pseudothecadactylus cavaticus =

Conservation status
- Least Concern (IUCN 3.1)

Scientific classification
- Kingdom: Animalia
- Phylum: Chordata
- Class: Reptilia
- Order: Squamata
- Suborder: Gekkota
- Family: Diplodactylidae
- Genus: Pseudothecadactylus
- Species: P. cavaticus

Binomial name
- Pseudothecadactylus cavaticus Cogger, 1975

Synonyms
- Rhacodactylus cavaticus

Species of lizard

Pseudothecadactylus cavaticus is a gecko endemic to northern Western Australia. The species has an average length from snout to vent of 11.5 cm.
