= Cape York pad-tail gecko =

Conservation status
- Least Concern (IUCN 3.1)

Scientific classification
- Domain: Eukaryota
- Kingdom: Animalia
- Phylum: Chordata
- Class: Reptilia
- Order: Squamata
- Infraorder: Gekkota
- Family: Diplodactylidae
- Genus: Pseudothecadactylus
- Species: P. australis

Binomial name
- Pseudothecadactylus australis (Günther, 1877)

Synonyms
- Thecadactylus australis; Torresia australis; Rhacodactylus australis

Species of lizard

The Cape York pad-tail gecko (Pseudothecadactylus australis) is a gecko endemic to Australia.
