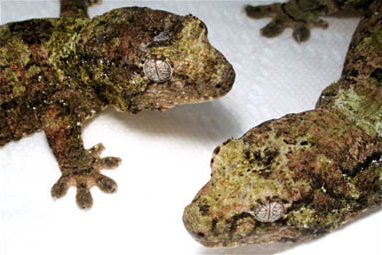

Conservation status
- Vulnerable (IUCN 3.1)

Scientific classification
- Kingdom: Animalia
- Phylum: Chordata
- Class: Reptilia
- Order: Squamata
- Suborder: Gekkota
- Family: Diplodactylidae
- Genus: Mniarogekko
- Species: M. chahoua

Binomial name
- Mniarogekko chahoua (Bavay, 1869)

Synonyms
- Platydactylus chahoua Bavay, 1869; Platydactylus (Rhacodactylus) chahoua — Sauvage, 1879 (part); Chameleonurus chahoua — Boulenger, 1879 (part); Rhacodactylus chahoua — Boulenger, 1883; Mniarogekko chahoua — A.M. Bauer et al., 2012

= Mniarogekko chahoua =

Species of lizard

Mniarogekko chahoua, commonly known as the mossy New Caledonian gecko, short-snouted New Caledonian gecko, Bavay's giant gecko, mossy prehensile-tailed gecko, or simply the chahoua gecko (especially in the pet trade) is an arboreal gecko found natively on the southern portion of the island of New Caledonia and on the outlying islands of Île des Pins.

== Conservation status ==
Mniarogekko chahoua is currently listed as Vulnerable by the IUCN Red List.

== Taxonomy and systematics ==
Mniarogekko chahoua was first described in 1869 as Platydactylus chahoua by Arthur Bavay, a French pharmacist and herpetologist.

== Description ==
Mniarogekko chahoua gets its common name from the moss or lichen-like pattern it displays. Colors range from rusty red and brown to green or gray. There has been some notation that color could possibly be a geographic indicator in this species as the geckos from the outer islands most often display the lighter gray patterns. It possesses a strong, well-muscled, fully prehensile tail and is not subject to dropping it as readily as some of its relatives. Adult length is 10-12" (25–31 cm).

== Diet ==
Mniarogekko chahoua, like most of the New Caledonian geckos, are seasonally-dependent omnivores and frugivores. Their diet in the wild consists of various insects and fruits, generally alternating from one to the other according to several factors, including seasonal changes, tree and fruit blooming times, and fruit and insect availability. They may also supplement their diet with small lizards.

== Reproduction ==
Mniarogekko chahoua lays two well-calcified eggs that become adhered to one another shortly after laying. This is known as "egg gluing". Mniarogekko chahoua is the only Rhacodactylus gecko that lays adhering eggs. The eggs are generally laid on top of the substrate (usually under loose tree bark and leaf litter) and are guarded by the female. The eggs hatch 60–90 days after laying.

== Captivity ==
This gecko is sometimes found in the pet trade, and typically available captive-bred. With good care, this species can live up to 15–20 years.
