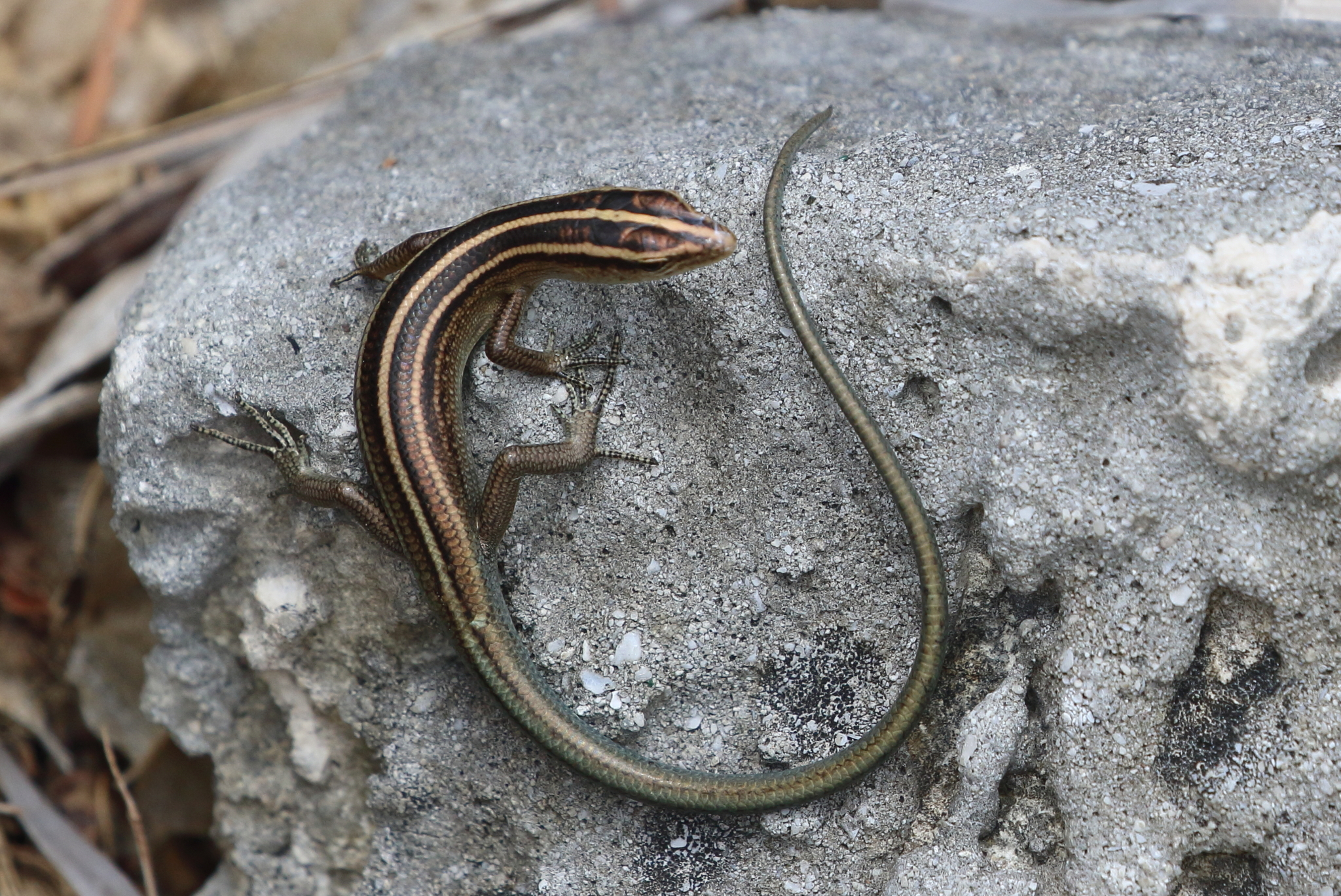

Conservation status
- Vulnerable (IUCN 3.1)

Scientific classification
- Kingdom: Animalia
- Phylum: Chordata
- Class: Reptilia
- Order: Squamata
- Family: Scincidae
- Genus: Emoia
- Species: E. loyaltiensis

Binomial name
- Emoia loyaltiensis (Roux, 1913)
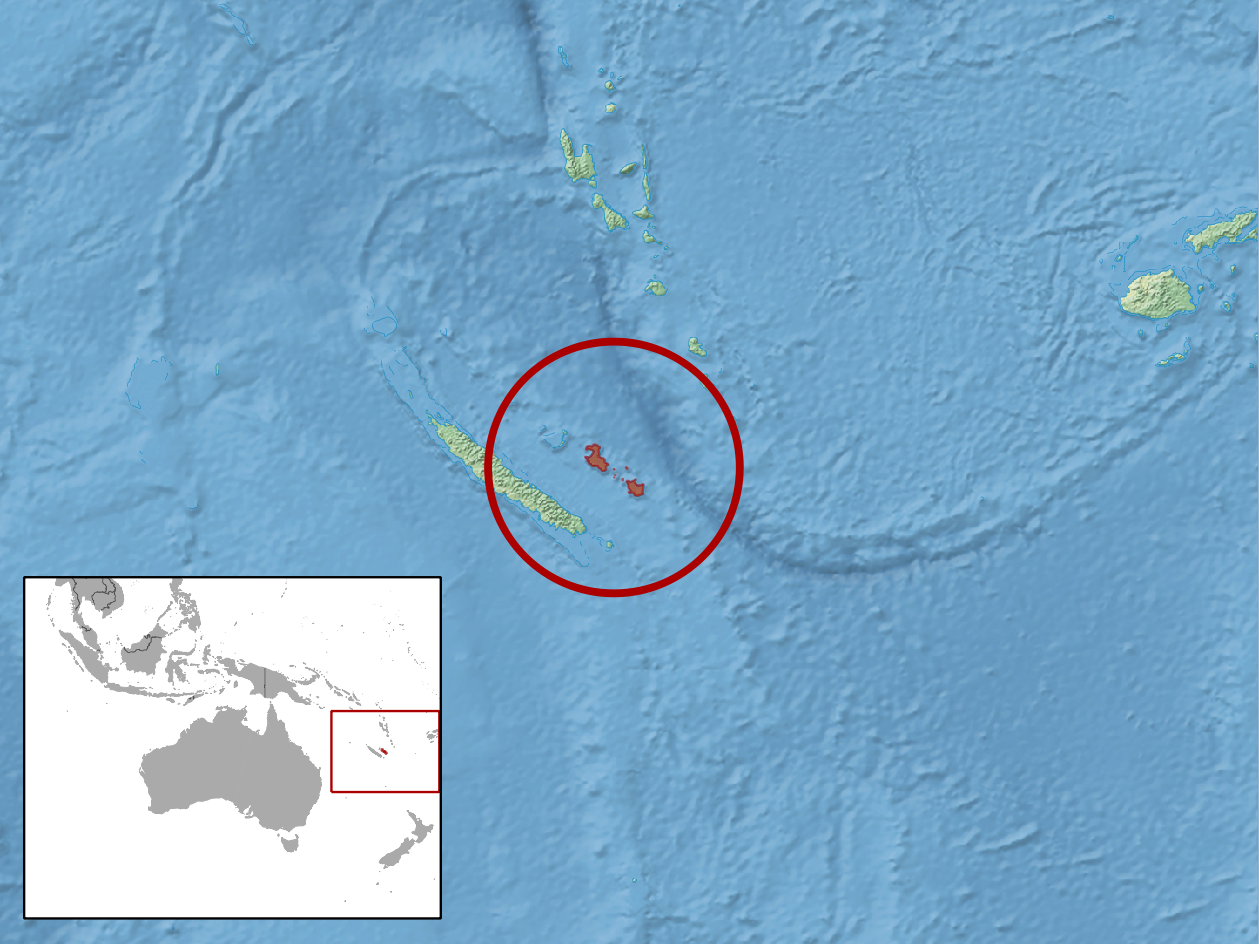

= Emoia loyaltiensis =

Species of lizard

Emoia loyaltiensis also known as Roux's emo skink or Loyalty Islands emoia, is a species of lizard in the family Scincidae. It is found in New Caledonia.
