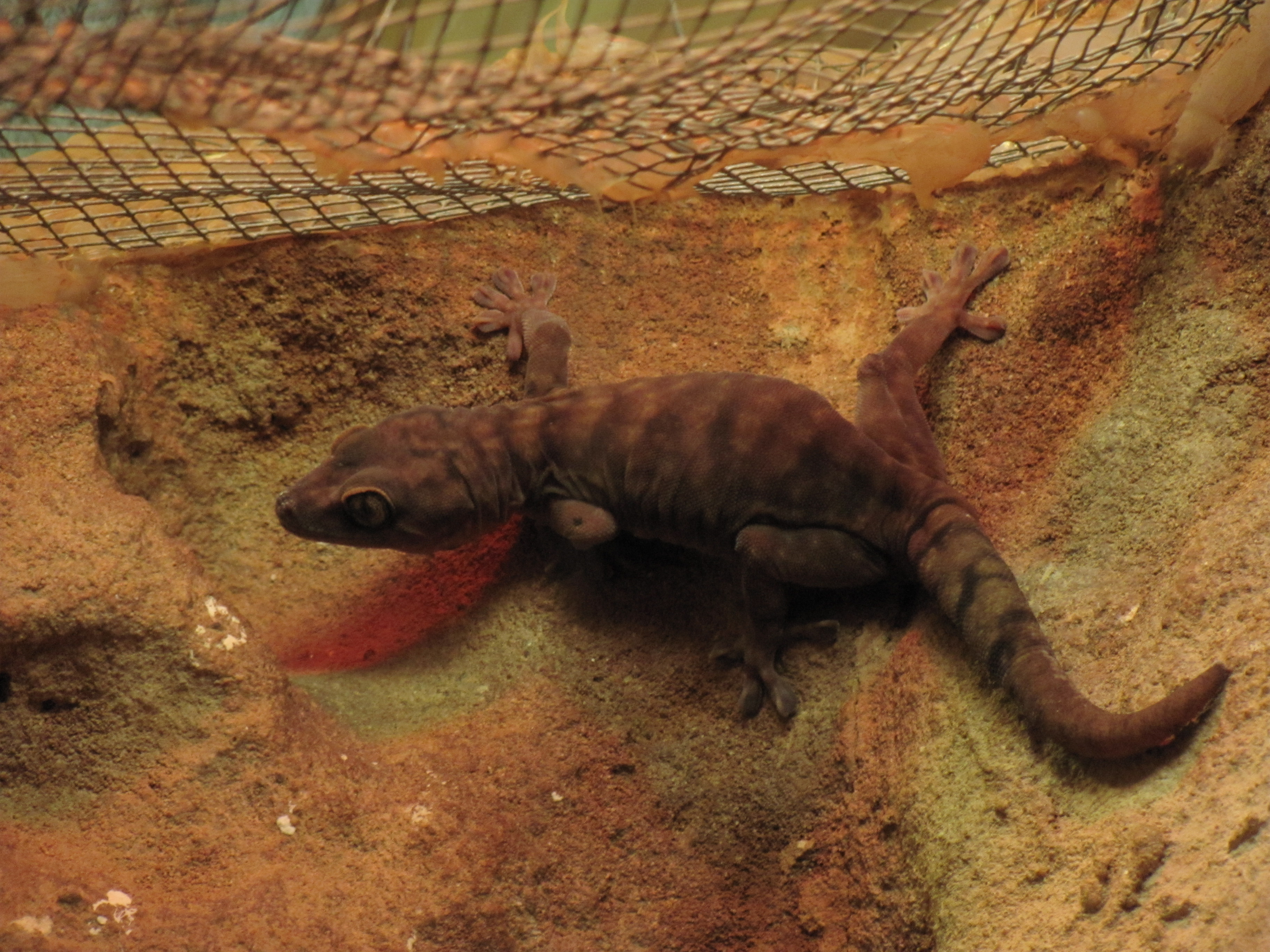
- Giant cave gecko (Pseudothecadactylus lindneri)

Scientific classification
- Domain: Eukaryota
- Kingdom: Animalia
- Phylum: Chordata
- Class: Reptilia
- Order: Squamata
- Infraorder: Gekkota
- Family: Diplodactylidae
- Genus: Pseudothecadactylus; Brongersma, 1936

= Pseudothecadactylus =

Genus of lizards

Pseudothecadactylus is a genus of geckos found in various states of Australia.

== Species ==
Three species are recognized as being valid.

- Pseudothecadactylus australis (Günther, 1877) – Cape York pad-tail gecko
- Pseudothecadactylus cavaticus Cogger, 1975
- Pseudothecadactylus lindneri Cogger, 1975 – giant cave gecko

Nota bene: A binomial authority in parentheses indicates that the species was originally described in a genus other than Pseudothecadactylus.

The specific name, lindneri, is in honor of Australian herpetologist David A. Lindner.
