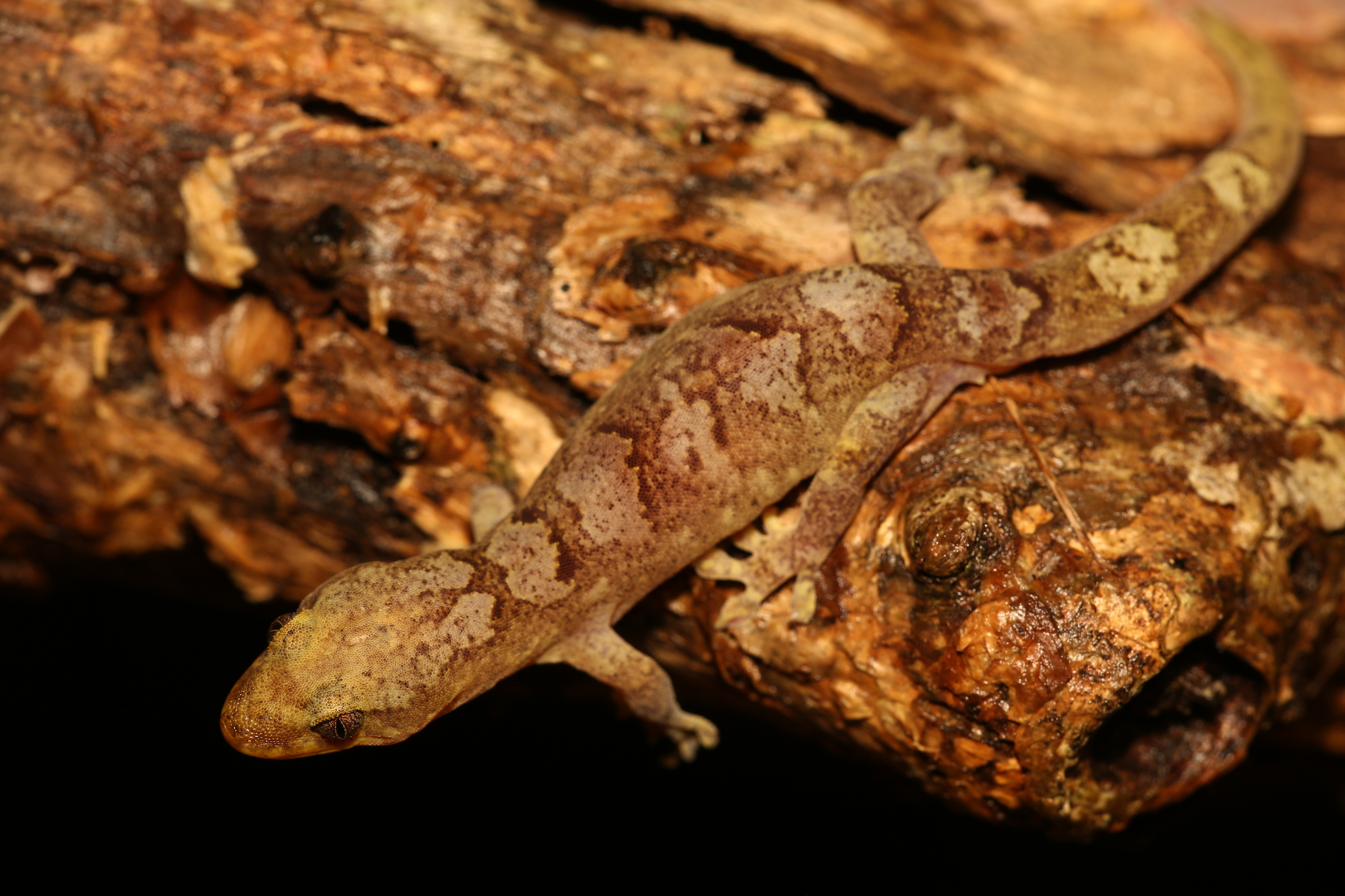

Conservation status
- Endangered (IUCN 3.1)

Scientific classification
- Kingdom: Animalia
- Phylum: Chordata
- Class: Reptilia
- Order: Squamata
- Suborder: Gekkota
- Family: Diplodactylidae
- Genus: Bavayia
- Species: B. cyclura

Binomial name
- Bavayia cyclura Günther, 1872

= Bavayia cyclura =

Species of lizard

Bavayia cyclura, also known as Günther's New Caledonian gecko or the forest bavayia, is a gecko endemic to Grande Terre and Ile des Pins including their neighboring islets in New Caledonia.
