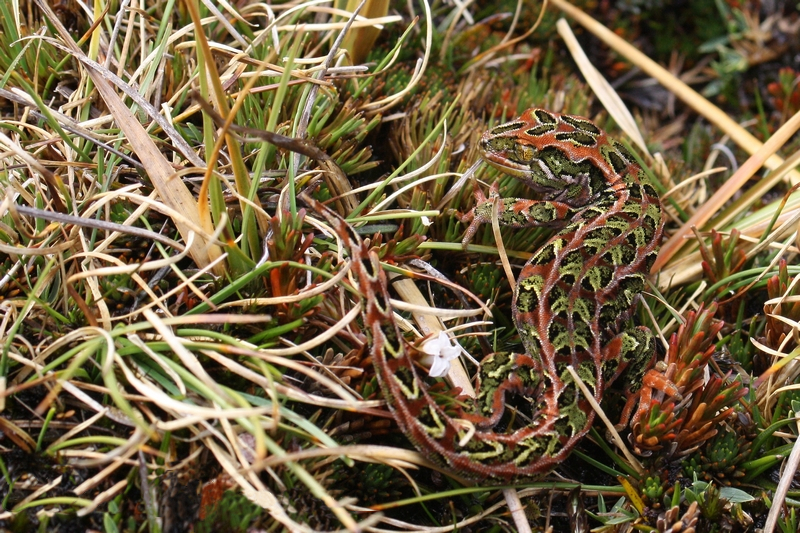

Conservation status
- Endangered (IUCN 3.1)
- CITES Appendix III

Scientific classification
- Kingdom: Animalia
- Phylum: Chordata
- Class: Reptilia
- Order: Squamata
- Suborder: Gekkota
- Family: Diplodactylidae
- Genus: Tukutuku; Nielsen, Bauer, Jackman, Hitchmough & Daugherty, 2011
- Species: T. rakiurae

Binomial name
- Tukutuku rakiurae (Thomas, 1981)
- Distribution map of Tukutuku rakiurae on Stewart Island.

Synonyms
- Hoplodactylus rakiurae B. Thomas, 1981; Tukutuku rakiurae — Nielsen et al., 2011

= Harlequin gecko =

Species of lizard

The harlequin gecko (Tukutuku rakiurae), formerly Hoplodactylus rakiurae, is a species of gecko, a lizard in the family Diplodactylidae. The species is endemic to Stewart Island / Rakiura in the far south of New Zealand, where it was discovered in 1969. In terms of distribution it is one of the southernmost gecko species in the world.

== Etymology ==
The generic name, Tukutuku, refers to the Māori ornamental lattice work called tukutuku, which the dorsal pattern of this species resembles. The specific name, rakiurae, refers to Rakiura, the Māori name for Stewart Island.

== Habitat ==
The preferred habitats of T. rakiurae are shrubland and wetlands.

== Reproduction ==
T. rakiurae is viviparous.

== Conservation status and threats ==
The harlequin gecko has been assessed as Endangered by the IUCN since 2018, owing to its rarity, small range and declining population. Stewart Island is overrun with invasive predators such as cats (Felis domesticus) and rats (Rattus rattus, R. exulans, and R. norvegicus), which have also contributed to declines among native bird species. Like other New Zealand geckos, harlequin geckos breed and develop very slowly, with a female giving birth to only one offspring every two or three years. Each generation, which takes about 20 years to mature, appears to have about 30% fewer individuals than the previous generation. Poaching for the international pet trade is another potential threat: although the species has yet to be introduced into the pet trade, it is a known target of poachers acting within Rakiura National Park.

As of 2012 the Department of Conservation (DOC) classified the harlequin gecko as Nationally Vulnerable under the New Zealand Threat Classification System. The species is protected under Appendix III of the Convention on International Trade in Endangered Species (CITES), meaning international import/export is regulated by the CITES permitting system.
