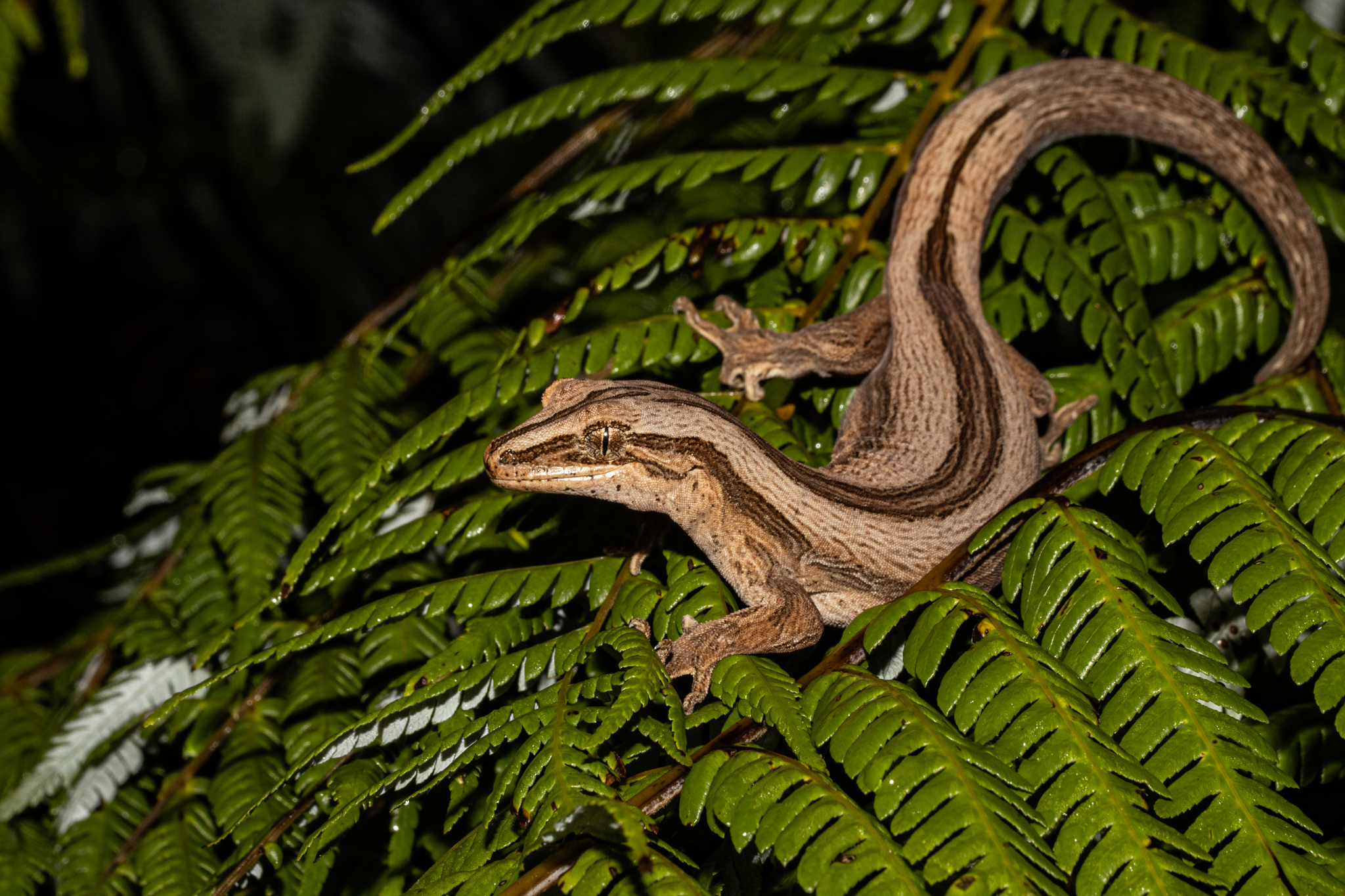
- Northern striped gecko on a fern

Scientific classification
- Domain: Eukaryota
- Kingdom: Animalia
- Phylum: Chordata
- Class: Reptilia
- Order: Squamata
- Infraorder: Gekkota
- Family: Diplodactylidae
- Genus: Toropuku
- Species: T. inexpectatus

Binomial name
- Toropuku inexpectatus Hitchmough, Nielsen, & Bauer, 2020
- Distribution of Toropuku inexpectatus on a map of the North Island Known native range

= Toropuku inexpectatus =

Species of gecko

Toropuku inexpectatus, the northern striped gecko, is a viviparous species of gecko found on the Coromandel Peninsula, New Zealand.

Toropuku inexpectatus can grow to 95 mm (3.7 in) in snout–vent length.
