= Florida keratopathy =

Veterinary eye condition

Florida keratopathy, also known as Florida spots, is an eye condition characterized by the presence of multiple spots within both corneas. It is most commonly seen in dogs and cats, but is also rarely seen in horses and birds. The disease is found in the southeastern parts of the United States. In other parts of the world it is confined to tropics and subtropics, and it is known as tropical keratopathy.

Florida keratopathy appears as multiple cloudy opacities in the stromal layer of the cornea. The spots appear concentrated at the center and become more diffuse at the periphery. They can range in size from one to eight millimeters. There are no other symptoms, and there is no response to treatment with either anti-inflammatory or antimicrobial drugs. Histological analysis of affected corneas has found acid-fast staining organisms, suggesting Florida keratopathy may be caused by a type of mycobacterium. The disease may be induced by repeated stings to the eyes by the little fire ant, Wasmannia auropunctata.
