= Paniegekko =

Paniegekko madjo

Conservation status
- Endangered (IUCN 3.1)

Scientific classification
- Kingdom: Animalia
- Phylum: Chordata
- Class: Reptilia
- Order: Squamata
- Suborder: Gekkota
- Family: Diplodactylidae
- Genus: Paniegekko; Bauer, Jackman, Sadlier, A. Whitaker, 2012
- Species: P. madjo

Binomial name
- Paniegekko madjo (Bauer, Jones, & Sadlier, 2000)

Synonyms
- Bavayia madjo (Bauer, Jones, & Sadlier, 2000)

Species of lizard

Paniegekko is a monotypic genus of geckos in the family Diplodactylidae, containing the species Paniegekko madjo. It is endemic to humid montane forests on Mont Ignambi and Mont Panié in the Panié massif of New Caledonia. It was once considered a species of Bavayia, a similar genus of arboreal geckos. Paniegekko madjo is endangered, owing to predation by introduced rodents and cats combined with habitat degradation by wildfires and introduced pigs (Sus domesticus) and deer (Rusa timorensis). It has not been observed since 1998.
