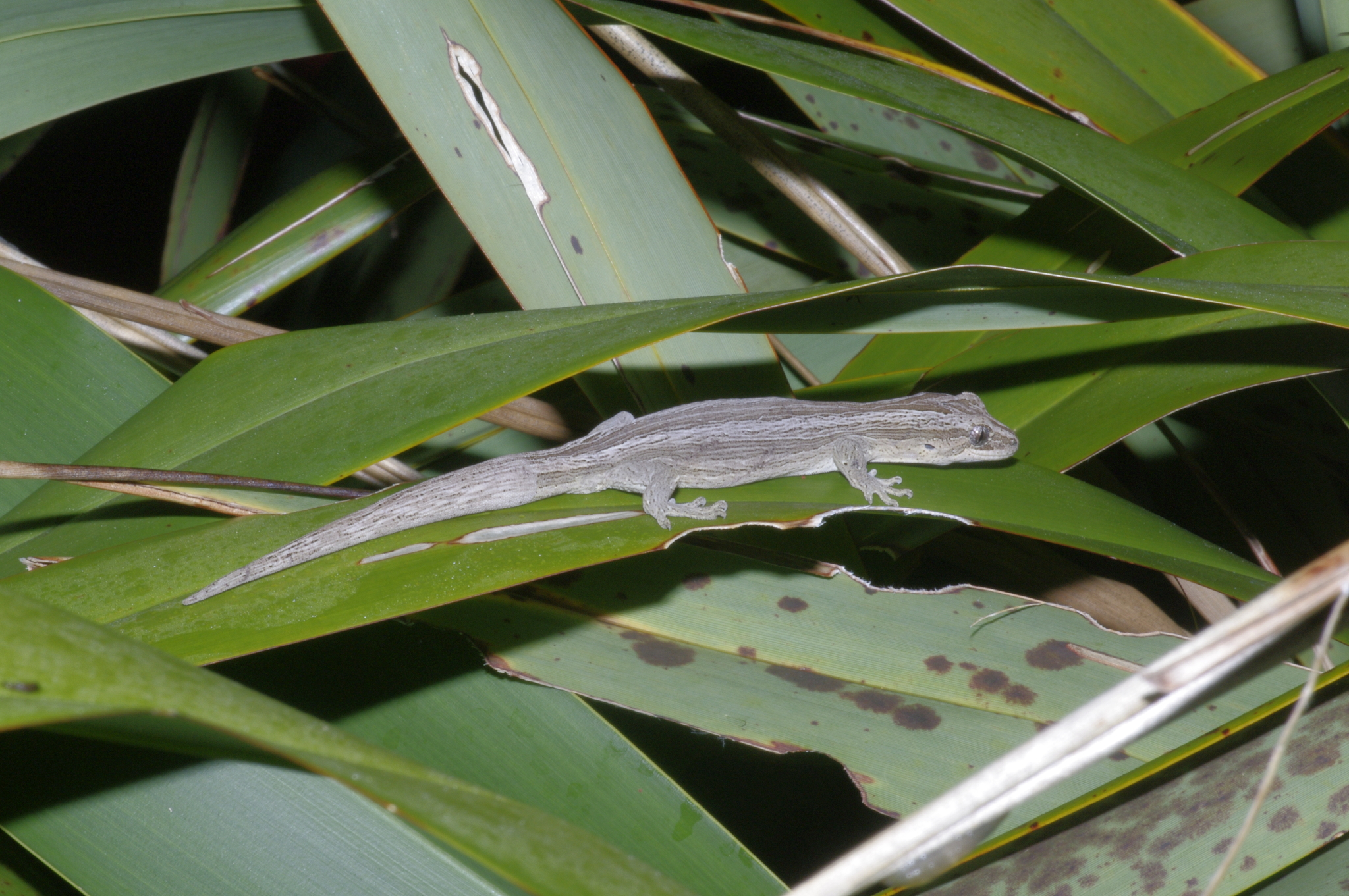
- Stephen's Island gecko Toropuku stephensi

Conservation status
- CITES Appendix III

Scientific classification
- Kingdom: Animalia
- Phylum: Chordata
- Class: Reptilia
- Order: Squamata
- Suborder: Gekkota
- Family: Diplodactylidae
- Genus: Toropuku; Nielsen, Bauer, Jackman, Hitchmough, & Daugherty, 2011

= Toropuku =

Genus of lizards

Toropuku is a genus of lizards in the family Diplodactylidae endemic to New Zealand. It includes two species:

- Toropuku stephensi (Robb, 1980) – Stephen’s sticky-toed gecko, Stephens Island gecko, striped gecko
- Toropuku inexpectatus Hitchmough, Nielsen, & Bauer, 2020
