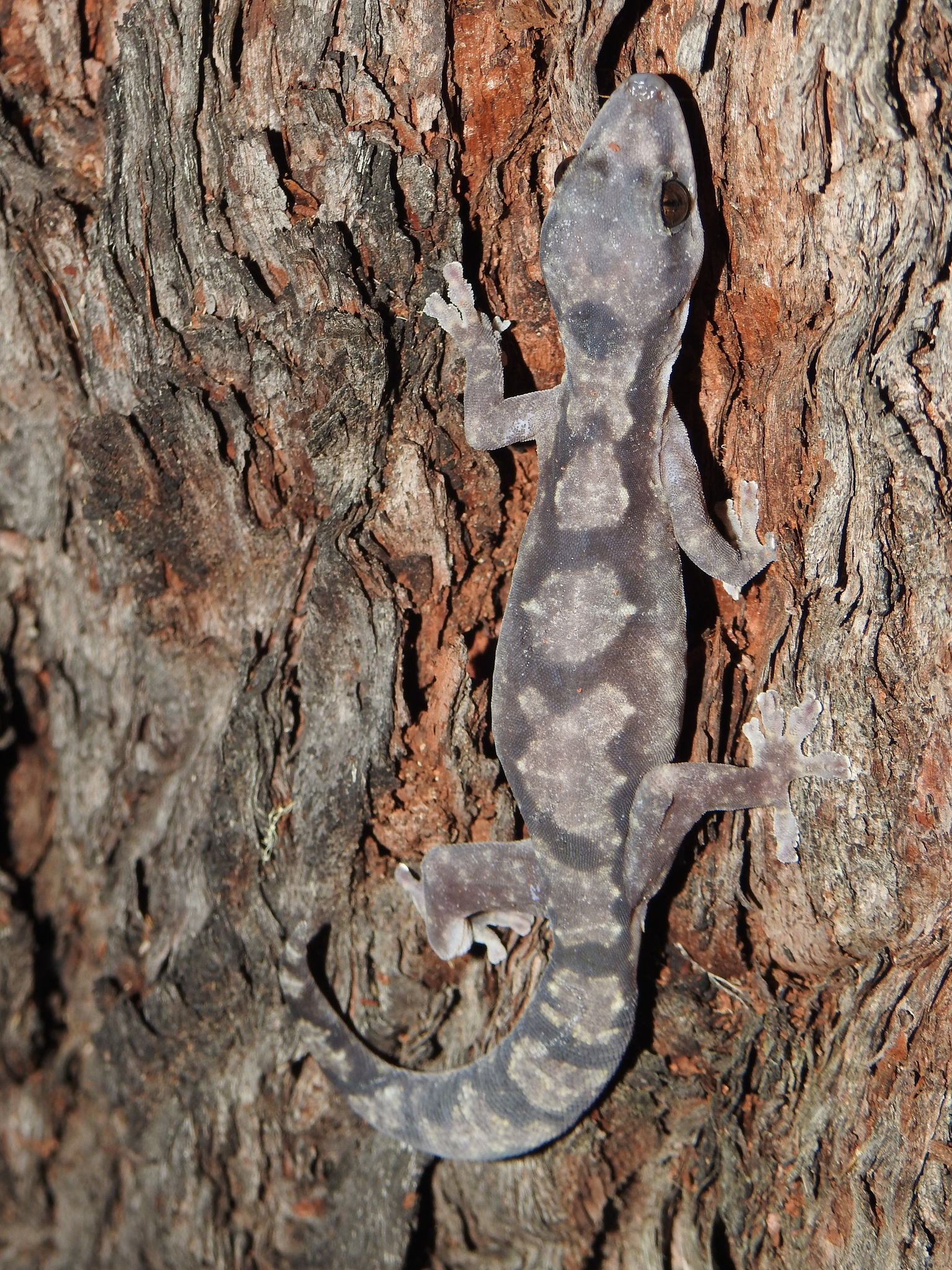

Scientific classification
- Kingdom: Animalia
- Phylum: Chordata
- Class: Reptilia
- Order: Squamata
- Suborder: Gekkota
- Family: Diplodactylidae
- Genus: Nebulifera; Oliver, Bauer, Greenbaum, Jackman and Hobbie, 2012
- Species: N. robusta

Binomial name
- Nebulifera robusta (Boulenger, 1885)

Synonyms
- Oedura robusta; Amalosia robusta

= Robust velvet gecko =

Species of lizard

The robust velvet gecko or robust gecko (Nebulifera robusta) is a species of gecko endemic to Australia.
