= Dierogekko validiclavis =

Conservation status
- Endangered (IUCN 3.1)

Scientific classification
- Kingdom: Animalia
- Phylum: Chordata
- Class: Reptilia
- Order: Squamata
- Suborder: Gekkota
- Family: Diplodactylidae
- Genus: Dierogekko
- Species: D. validiclavis

Binomial name
- Dierogekko validiclavis (Sadlier, 1988)

Synonyms
- Bavayia validiclavis

Species of lizard

Dierogekko validiclavis, also known as the bold-striped gecko, is a gecko endemic to Grande Terre in New Caledonia.
