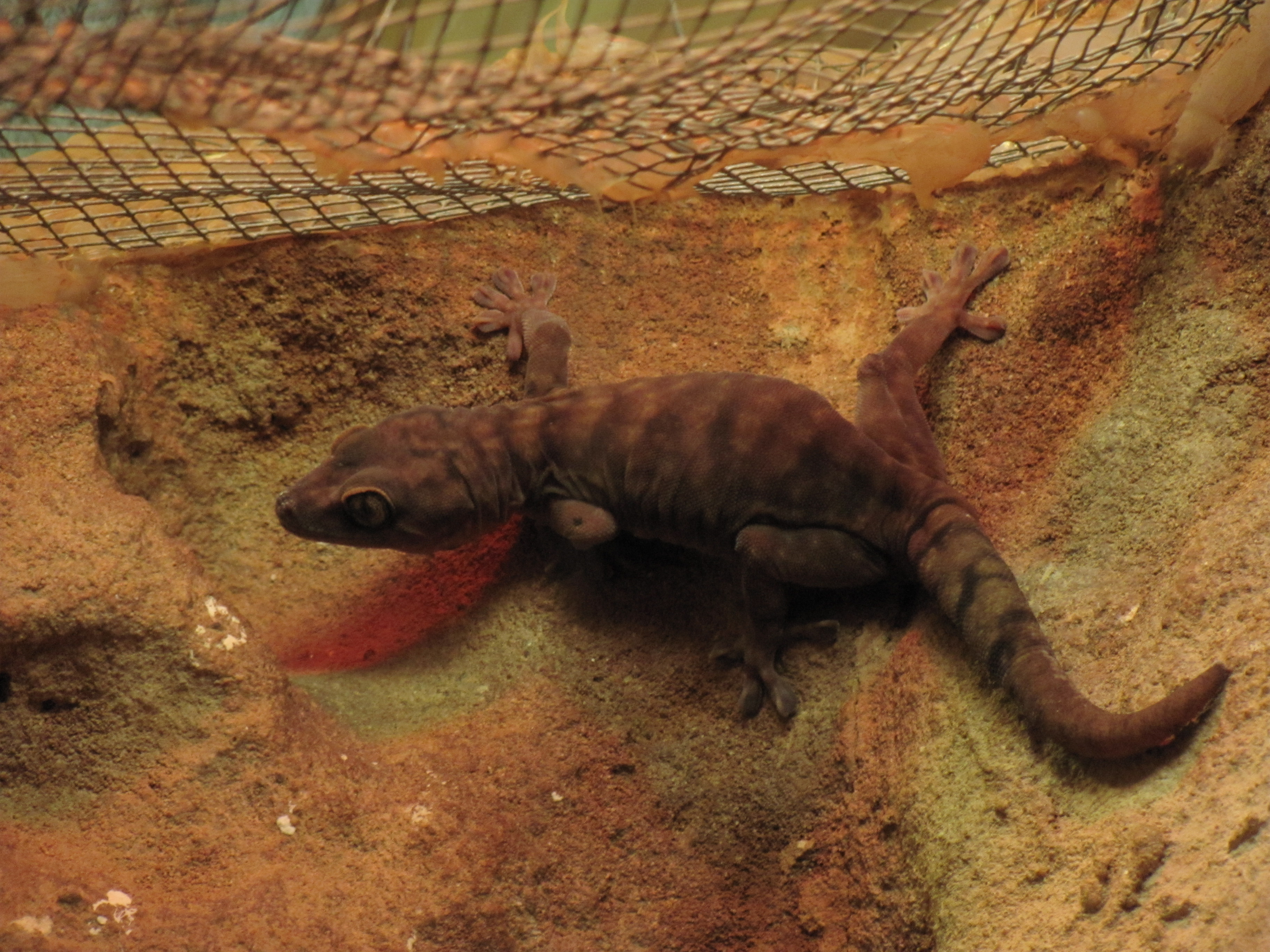
- Pseudothecadactylus lindneri

Conservation status
- Least Concern (IUCN 3.1)

Scientific classification
- Kingdom: Animalia
- Phylum: Chordata
- Class: Reptilia
- Order: Squamata
- Suborder: Gekkota
- Family: Diplodactylidae
- Genus: Pseudothecadactylus
- Species: P. lindneri

Binomial name
- Pseudothecadactylus lindneri Cogger, 1975

Synonyms
- Rhacodactylus lindneri (Cogger, 1975)

= Giant cave gecko =

Species of lizard

The giant cave gecko (Pseudothecadactylus lindneri), also known commonly as the northern giant cave gecko, is a species of lizard in the family Diplodactylidae. The species is endemic to Australia.

== Etymology ==
The specific name, lindneri, is in honor of Australian herpetologist David A. Lindner.

== Description ==
Adults of P. lindneri usually have a snout-to-vent length (SVL) of about 9.5 cm (3.7 in). The dorsal coloration is dark purplish brown, with lighter irregular crossbands. The crossbands are pale orange to cream-colored, and often do not meet neatly in the middle.

== Geographic range ==
P. lindneri is found in Arnhem Land, Northern Territory, Australia.

== Habitat ==
The preferred natural habitat of P. lindneri is caves and crevices in sandstone escarpments.

== Reproduction ==
P. lindneri is oviparous.
