= Jean Roux =

Swiss herpetologist

Jean Roux (March 1876, Geneva – 1 December 1939) was a Swiss herpetologist.

He studied at the University of Geneva, completing his doctoral thesis in 1899. His early research involved studies of protozoa, and following post-doctoral work in Berlin, he became a curator at the natural history museum in Basel. Here, he performed analysis of herpetological specimens collected by Fritz Müller, his predecessor at Basel.

In 1907–08, with Hugo Merton, he performed scientific research in the Aru and Kei Islands, and in 1911–12, with Fritz Sarasin, he visited New Caledonia and the Loyalty Islands. As a result of the latter expedition, he published with Sarasin a major work titled, Nova Caledonia. Forschungen in Neu-Caledonien und auf den Loyalty-Inseln. Recherches scientifiques en Nouvelle-Calédonie et aux iles Loyalty. During his career, he was the author of 35 papers on herpetological subjects.

== Eponymy ==
In 1913 he described "Roux's emo skink" (Emoia loyaltiensis) and "Roux's giant gecko" (Rhacodactylus sarasinorum). His name is also commemorated with a skink species called Lipinia rouxi (Hediger, 1934) and frog Phrynobatrachus rouxi.
