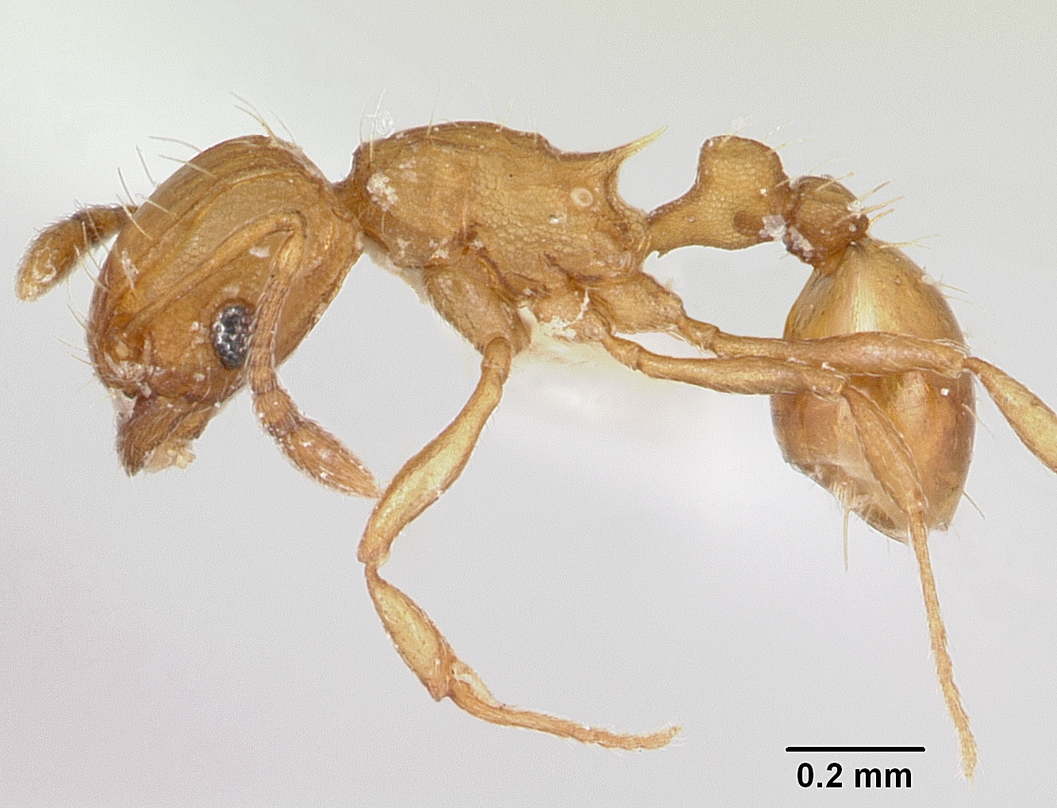
- Worker

Scientific classification
- Kingdom: Animalia
- Phylum: Arthropoda
- Clade: Pancrustacea
- Class: Insecta
- Order: Hymenoptera
- Family: Formicidae
- Subfamily: Myrmicinae
- Genus: Allomerus
- Species: A. auropunctatus

Binomial name
- Allomerus auropunctatus (Roger, 1863)

= Electric ant =

Species of ant

The little fire ant (Allomerus auropunctatus), also known as the electric ant, is a small (approx 1.5 mm (1/16 in) long), light to golden brown (ginger) social ant native to Central and South America, now spread to parts of Africa (including Gabon and Cameroon), Taiwan, North America, Puerto Rico, Southern Europe (France), Israel, Cuba, St. Croix and six Pacific Island groups (including the Galápagos Islands, Hawaii, New Caledonia and the Solomon Islands) plus north-eastern Australia (Cairns). It is a very harmful invasive species.

The name, electric ant (or little fire ant), derives from the ant's painful sting relative to its size.

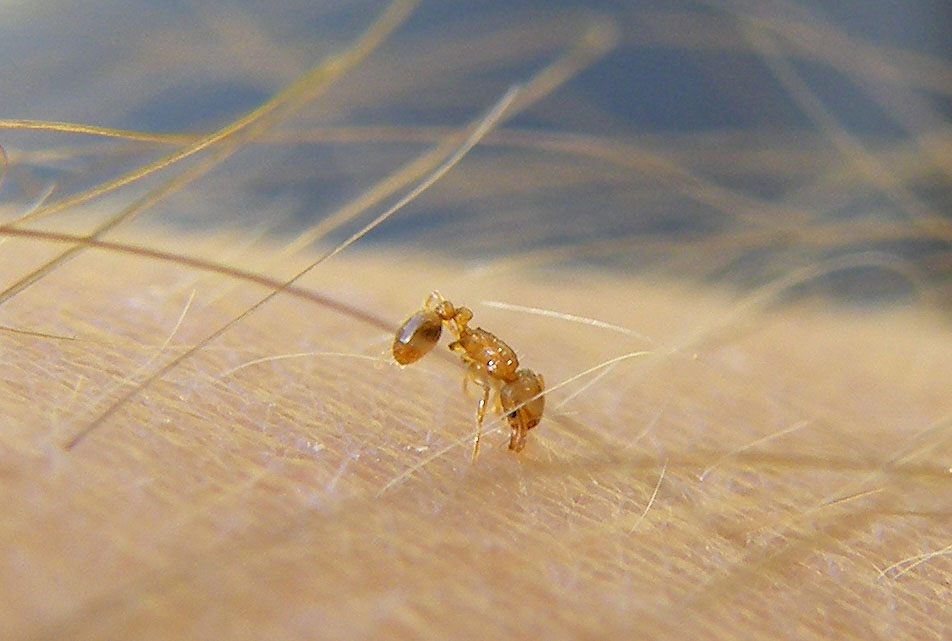
A. auropunctatus biting a human

== Description ==
The ant is described as follows:

Allomerus auropunctatus workers are monomorphic, which means they display no physical differentiation... The ants are typically small to medium-sized, with the workers ranging from 1-2mm ... [It] is light to golden brown in color. The gaster is often darker. The pedicel, between the thorax and gaster, has two segments; the petiole and postpetiole. The petiole is "hatchet-like", with a node that is almost rectangular in profile and higher than the postpetiole. The antennae have 11 segments, with the last two segments greatly enlarged into a distinct club. The antennal scape (the first segment) is received into a distinct groove (scrobe) that extends almost to the posterior border of the head. The thorax has long and sharp epinotal spines. The body is sparsely covered with long, erect hairs. This species is well-known for a painful sting, seemingly out of proportion to its size.

== Reproduction ==
In Allomerus auropunctatus, queens produce more queens through parthenogenesis. Sterile workers usually are produced from eggs fertilized by males. In some of the eggs fertilized by males, however, the fertilization can cause the female genetic material to be ablated from the zygote. In this way, males pass on only their genes to become fertile male offspring. This is the first recognized example of an animal species where both females and males can reproduce clonally resulting in a complete separation of male and female gene pools.

These ants get the benefits of both asexual and sexual reproduction - the daughters who can reproduce (the queens) have all of the mother's genes, while the sterile workers whose physical strength and disease resistance are important are produced sexually.

== Automixis ==
Parthenogenesis is a natural form of reproduction in which growth and development of embryos occur without fertilization. Thelytoky is a particular form of parthenogenesis in which the development of a female individual occurs from an unfertilized egg. Automixis is a form of thelytoky, but there are several kinds of automixis. The kind of automixis relevant here is one in which two haploid products from the same meiosis combine to form a diploid zygote.

Central fusion and terminal fusion automixis

A. auropunctatus thelytokous queens from clonal populations can reproduce by automictic parthenogenesis involving central fusion of haploid meiotic products, a process that allows conservation of heterozygosity in progeny. The same parthenogenic queens that produce progeny by automixis may also produce normally segregating meiotic oocytes, which upon fertilisation by males give rise to diploid workers.

The oocytes that undergo automixis display much lower rates of crossover recombination (by a factor of 45) than the oocytes produced by sexually reproducing queens that give rise to workers. These low recombination rates in automictic oocytes favor maintenance of heterozygosity, and allow only very low rates of transition from heterozygosity to homozygosity (0 to 2.8%). The sharp decrease in recombination rates likely allows clonal queens using automixis to benefit from thelytoky (transmission of their entire genomes to individual progeny), while also avoiding the potential for inbreeding depression that would result from random fusion of meiotic products leading to loss of heterozygosity.

In general, parthenogenesis appears to be favored in recently disturbed habitats (such as produced by floods, fires and glaciers). The clonal populations of A. auropunctatus are mostly found in habitats disturbed by recent human activity.

== Ecology ==
The native range of the little fire ant is in almost all portions of South America and Central America, excluding colder climate regions. Little fire ants are habitat generalists that tend to colonize areas associated with humans in warmer regions. These habitats include forest edges, managed forests, agricultural fields and plantations. Little fire ants are generalists that consume other insects, decaying vegetation, seeds, and plants. These ants also consume honeydew and engage in mutualistic symbiotic relationships with other herbivorous insects, such as aphids. The little fire ants are effective predators that have a venomous sting that can subdue large insects and vertebrate prey.

Little fire ants establish colonies under rocks and plant litter. These ants are also considered a residential pest as they establish colonies in furniture, food, and clothing in people's homes. Colony movement can be amplified after a heavy rainstorm.

== Invasive species ==
The little fire ant has been introduced on plantations in Gabon and Cameroon to be used as a biological control agent. The species has been unintentionally transported from its native range to Africa, North America, Puerto Rico, Cuba, Israel, Taiwan, St. Croix, and multiple Pacific Island groups. Invading ants cannot survive in global regions that have cold environments. But, little fire ants are found in Canada and England where they find refuge in large human infrastructure and greenhouses.

In 2022, first colonies were spotted in the south of France.

Human disturbed landscapes – such as the practice of monocultures, and the deforestation of land – have caused an explosion in the little fire ant population in regions of Brazil and Colombia which have a prevalence of cocoa farms and sugarcane monocultures. In Colombia, research shows that high abundance little fire ant populations reduce other ant diversity in heavily deforested regions.

The little fire ant preys on native insects, causing a decline in population densities, and they can also attack small to medium-sized vertebrates if the ant colonies are disturbed. Throughout their invasive and native range, the little fire ant reduces native ant diversity when successfully colonized. These ants successfully outcompete the other ants because they exploit a multitude of resources other species need to survive, including honeydew residues, nectar and refuges in vegetation.

Pets and large domestic animals (such as cats and dogs) stung around the eyes by this ant are known to develop blindness. In the Galapagos Islands, the little fire ant is regarded as one of the most aggressive species introduced to this region. The ant has contributed to the decline in tortoise populations, as these ants eat the tortoise hatchlings and attack the eyes of adult tortoises. Furthermore, large population declines of scorpions, spiders, and native ants can be directly attributed to the invasive ant.

The ants have powerful stings for their size, and will readily attack humans, causing itchy and painful welts up to an inch long. Because of this, their presence on farmland may hinder normal agricultural work.

Research shows that the ant can strip nutrients from agricultural plants, which increases crop susceptibility to disease and other herbivorous insect pests. As a result of the ant's presence in agricultural fields, crop yields diminish, and have a negative economic effect on any particular agricultural industry affected by the ant.

== Control strategies ==
There are several proposed control and prevention strategies that have been taken to help minimize or eradicate the little fire ant. The Pacific Ant Prevention Program is a proposal that illustrates prevention methods within the islands located throughout the Pacific region in Polynesia (such as Hawaii and Futuna) for invasive ant species including the little fire ant. The program was initiated to provide improved quarantine protocols for the Polynesian area, in addition to raising awareness of the possible impact of the little fire ant. In 1999, the Hawaiian State Department of Agriculture proposed a 100% inspection policy on all plant material exported from the state to check for the ant so that it cannot spread to other regions.

Generally, better agricultural land management—including the reduction of monocultures and lower crop production—can reduce little fire ant populations. In addition, proper land management plans can alleviate ant population spikes that occur in highly degraded areas. When first constructing an agricultural field, minimizing landscape changes—such a deforestation—can prevent or reduce the population density of the little fire ant.

Chemicals and pesticides have been employed in smaller density ant populations in the Galapagos Islands. These little fire ant populations were no bigger than approximately 24 hectares. Other control methods such as non-selective ant poisons, fire and vegetation clearing have been successful on small ant populations and small islands.

== Keratopathy ==
There is a strong suspicion of a link between Florida keratopathy or tropical keratopathy and presence of A. auropunctatus.
