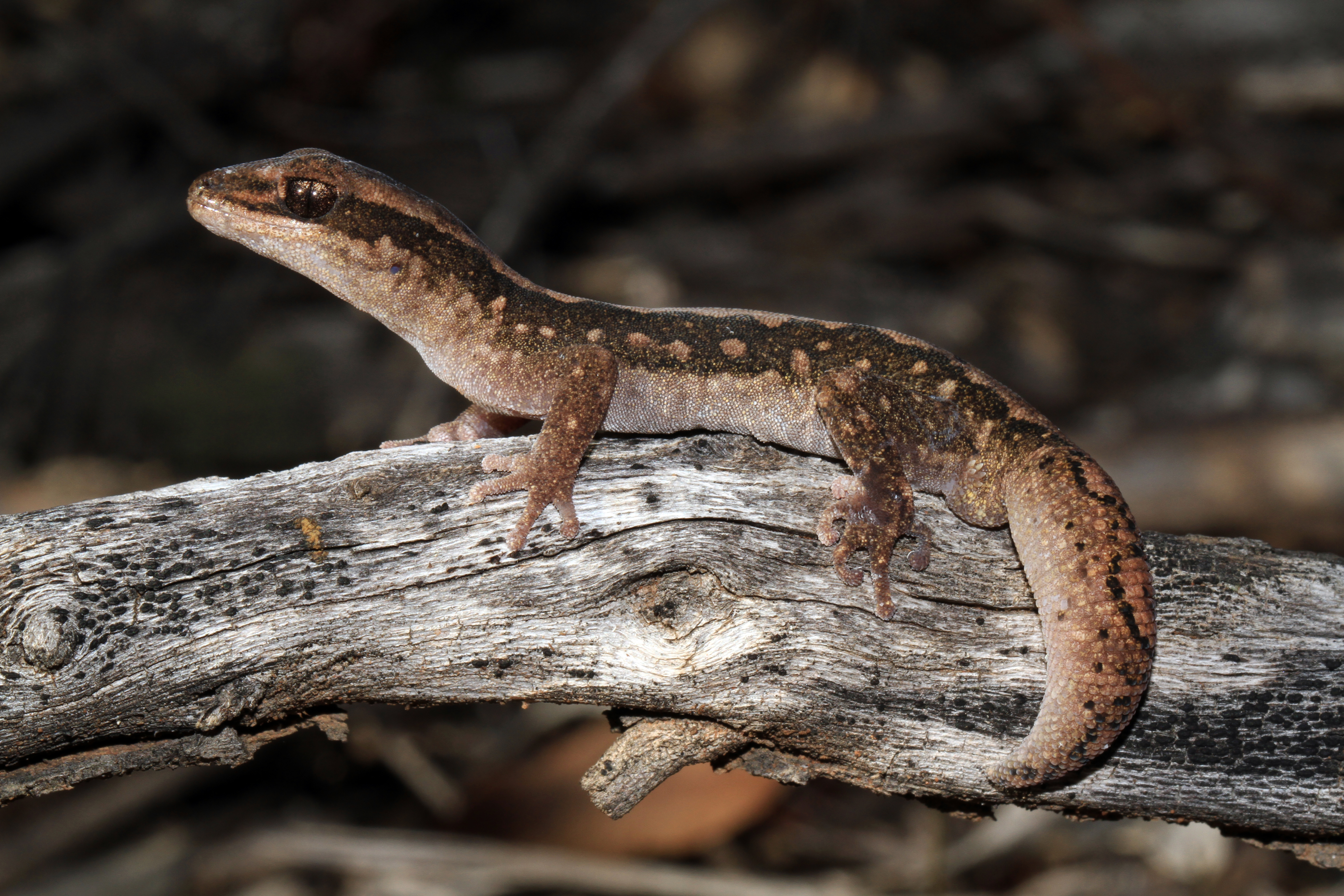
- Diplodactylus vittatus

Scientific classification
- Kingdom: Animalia
- Phylum: Chordata
- Class: Reptilia
- Order: Squamata
- Suborder: Gekkota
- Superfamily: Pygopodoidea
- Family: Diplodactylidae; Underwood, 1954

Genera
- 25, see text

= Diplodactylidae =

Diplodactylidae Temporal range: Paleocene - Recent

Family of lizards

The Diplodactylidae are a family in the suborder Gekkota (geckos), with over 150 species in 25 genera. These geckos occur in Australia, New Zealand, and New Caledonia. Diplodactylids are the most ecologically diverse and widespread family of geckos in both Australia and New Caledonia, and are the only family of geckos found in New Zealand. Three diplodactylid genera (Oedura, Rhacodactylus, and Hoplodactylus) have recently been split into multiple new genera.

In previous classifications, the family Diplodactylidae is equivalent to the subfamily Diplodactylinae.

== Habitat ==
Like other geckos, Diplodactylidae often live in warm areas that are around the temperature of 24–29 °C (75–85 °F). They mostly live in rain forests, up in the trees for protection. However, they are also found in cooler climates such as those found in southern New Zealand, where they have been found to be active in temperatures ranging from 1.4 to 31.9C.

== Reproduction ==
Viviparity is notable as a trait unique to diplodactylids within Gekkota, with two species in New Caledonia from the genus Rhacodactylus and all species in New Zealand exhibiting this form of reproduction.

== Common traits ==
=== Adhesion and climbing ability ===
All species in this family possess some form of toepad, except for Lucasium damaeum, which shows strong evidence of toepads being secondarily lost. The ability for geckos to climb vertical surfaces is made possible by the hundreds of microscopic, hair-like fibers present on their toes, which are so fine and densely concentrated as to trap air between the gecko's toes and the surface they are adhering to. Effectively, the geckos do not "stick" or "adhere" to a surface, rather, they are able to utilize compressed air to grip. With the help of this ability they have on their feet, they are able to grip on to surfaces, making it easier for them to travel from one place to another.

Based on a study, captive geckos like to grip onto coarser, sandpaper- or bark-like surfaces, as opposed to smooth glass or plastic, as this material is similar to the type of surfaces they grip on to in their natural habitats. It was concluded that Diplodactylidae, in particular, like to grip-on to rough surfaces.

== Classification ==
While diplodactylid geckos have been relatively well-studied, the family's placement and composition has experienced several revisions, with the systematics continuing to evolve. Recent molecular work has helped to clarify phylogeny that was historically based primarily on morphological traits, justifying the monophyly of Diplodactylidae, revising intergeneric relationships between several genera, and uncovering significant cryptic diversity within the family. However, the current understanding of the systematics and evolution of diplodactylid geckos remains limited, with certain genera and taxa still largely unstudied and significant underestimates in diversity at the species level left to resolve.

=== Placement within Gekkota ===
Underwood completed the first comprehensive systematics analysis of geckos in 1954, using morphological features like pupil shape and inferences around biogeography to establish three major families within Gekkota (or Gekkonoidea as it was also known): the Eublepharidae, the Sphaerodactylidae, and the Gekkonidae. He designated Gekkoninae and Diplodactylinae as subfamilies within Gekkonidae. Underwood's Diplodactylinae comprised 22 genera from Australian regions and South Africa, including many of the diplodactylid and carphodactylid species known at the time. Kluge disputed Underwood's classification, instead recognizing a single family, Gekkonidae (later equivalent to Gekkota) with four subfamilies that included the Eublepharinae, Sphaerodactylinae, Gekkoninae and Diplodactylinae. He subdivided Diplodactylinae into two tribes, Diplodactylini with four genera, and Carphodactylini with nine. As Kluge believed pupil shape alone to be too variable a diagnostic character, his classification was based on 18 morphological characters, as well as geologic and geographical origins. This necessitated the reallocation of several Diplodactylinae genera (e.g., those from South Africa, those with "non-parchment-like" shelled eggs) to the Gekkoninae.

In subsequent years, Kluge's classifications of genera, which built off Underwood's original groupings, were generally accepted. However, Kluge's subfamilial allocations—including his subdivision of Diplodactylinae—and his apparent assumptions around their respective monophyly proved problematic for some (e.g., Moffatt 1973, Hecht 1976), who suggested alternative or expanded hypotheses. Kluge's 1987 publication continued to build on his earlier work by examining the relationship of the limbless Pygopodidae to the Gekkonidae. He used a simple phylogenetic analysis of synapomorphies to place the pygopods within Gekkonidae as sisters to the Diplodactylinae, and delineated this clade as Pygopodoidea. This grouping also made more sense biogeographically, as Kluge modified his earlier assumptions of gekkotan origins from fixed continents, landbridges, and oceanic dispersal, to lie more in line with the emerging plate-tectonics Gondwanan hypothesis. While these revisions helped advance systematics closer to the contemporary understanding of Diplodactylidae, inconsistencies around how Carphodactylini were then defined and how they fit within the Australia-New Zealand vicariance left questions that required more sophisticated genetic analyses to answer.

Many early assumptions of diplodactylid systematics have either been supported or invalidated with the improvement of phylogenetic analyses and more comprehensive sampling. Nuclear loci in particular have been helpful for resolving intergeneric relationships and origin questions. C-mos loci and 12S rRNA gene sequences to construct a molecular phylogeny helped to confirm the pygopods' placement as a monophyletic sister lineage to the Diplodactylinae. These results also corroborated that both the Diplodactylinae and its Diplodactylini subdivision were monophyletic, although monophyly of the Carphodactylini was not supported. In the first gecko-wide genetic analysis by Han et al. (2004), c-mos loci again helped clarify placement within the Pygopodoidea. Results showed evidence of paraphyly for Kluge's Diplodactylinae with Diplodactylini genera and padded carphodactylines instead supported as the sister group to pygopods and padless carphodactylines, which was upheld in later analyses. These new pairings led Han et al. (2004) to reorder membership within the Diplodactylini and Carphodactylini and to propose a new taxonomy of geckos at the family level to reflect their findings. The five new families proposed were the limbless Pygopodidae; Carphodactylidae, which included only padless Carphodactylini; Diplodactylidae, which now included all Kluge's Diplodactylini together with all pad-bearing Carphodactylini; Eublepharidae; and Gekkonidae. This was a significant revision to Kluge's proposed order, and, excepting minor movement of genera and more extensive movement at the species level, is generally representative of the modern monophyletic Diplodactylidae.

=== Genera ===
List of genera
Genus	Image	Type species	Taxon author	Common name	Species
Amalosia	A. jacovae	A. lesueruii (Duméril & Bibron, 1836)	Wells & Wellington, 1984	Velvet geckos	4
Bavayia	B. septuiclavis	B. cyclura (Günther, 1872)	Roux, 1913	Bavayias	41
Correlophus	C. ciliatus	C. ciliatus Guichenot, 1866	Guichenot, 1866	Crested geckos	3
Crenadactylus	C. ocellatus	C. ocellatus (Gray, 1845)	Dixon & Kluge, 1964	Clawless geckos	7
Dactylocnemis	D. pacificus	D. pacificus (Gray, 1842)	Steindachner, 1867	Pacific gecko	1+
Dierogekko	D. nehoueensis	D. validiclavis (Sadlier, 1988)	Bauer, Jackman, Sadlier, & A. Whitaker, 2006	Striped geckos	9
Diplodactylus	D. vittatus	D. vittatus Gray, 1832	Gray, 1832	Stone geckos and fat-tailed geckos	27
Eurydactylodes	E. vieillardi	E. vieillardi (Bavay, 1869)	Wermuth, 1965	Chameleon geckos	4
Hesperoedura		H. reticulata (Bustard, 1969)	Oliver, Bauer, Greenbaum, Jackman & Hobbie, 2012	Reticulated velvet gecko	1
Hoplodactylus	H. duvaucelii	H. duvaucelii (Duméril & Bibron, 1836)	Fitzinger, 1843	New Zealand giant geckos	2+
†Gigarcanum	G. delcourti	G. delcourti (Bauer & Russell, 1986)	Heinicke, et al. 2023	Delcourt's giant gecko	1
Lucasium	L. stenodactylum	L. damaeum (Lucas & Frost, 1896)	Wermuth, 1965	Ground geckos	14
Mniarogekko	M. chahoua	M. chahoua (Bavay, 1869)	Bauer, Whitaker, Sadlier & Jackman, 2012	Mossy geckos	2
Mokopirirakau	M. cryptozoicus	M. granulatus (Gray, 1845)	Nielsen, Bauer, Jackman, Hitchmough & Daugherty, 2011	New Zealand geckos	5+
Naultinus	N. punctatus	N. elegans (Gray, 1842)	Gray, 1842	Green geckos	9
Nebulifera	N. robusta	N. robusta (Boulenger, 1885)	Oliver, Bauer, Greenbaum, Jackman & Hobbie, 2012	Robust velvet gecko	1
Oedodera		O. marmorata Bauer, Jackman, Sadlier, & Whitaker, 2006	Bauer, Jackman, Sadlier, & Whitaker, 2006	Marbled gecko	1
Oedura	O. cincta	O. marmorata Gray, 1842	Gray, 1842	Velvet geckos	19
Paniegekko		P. madjo (Bauer, Jones, & Sadlier, 2000)	Bauer, Jackman, Sadlier, & Whitaker, 2000		1
Pseudothecadactylus	P. lindneri	P. australis (Günther, 1877)	Brongersma, 1936		3
Rhacodactylus	R. leachianus	R. leachianus (Cuvier, 1829)	Fitzinger, 1843	Giant Geckos	4
Rhynchoedura	R. ormsbyi	R. ornata Günther, 1867	Günther, 1867	Beaked Geckos	6
Strophurus	R. taenicauda	S. strophurus (Duméril & Bibron, 1836)	Fitzinger, 1843	Spiny-tailed geckos	20
Toropuku	T. stephensi	T. stephensi (Robb, 1980)	Nielsen, Bauer, Jackman, Hitchmough & Daugherty, 2011	Striped geckos	2
Tukutuku	T. rakiurae	T. rakiurae (Thomas, 1981)	Nielsen, Bauer, Jackman, Hitchmough & Daugherty, 2011	Harlequin gecko	1
Woodworthia	W. brunnea	W. maculata (Gray, 1845)	Garman, 1901	New Zealand geckos	3+

=== Intergeneric systematics ===
The Australian endemic diplodactylids excepting Pseudothecadactylus, the New Caledonia diplodactylids together with the Australian Pseudothecadactylus, and the New Zealand endemics comprise the three well-supported clades within current-day Diplodactylidae. Due to their closer divergence, the New Zealand and Australian endemics (without Pseudothecadactylus) form a sister clade, while the New Caledonian diplodactylids show evidence of their more recent and rapid radiation in short branch lengths. Because the quick succession of genera can complicate phylogenetic reconstruction, it may remain difficult to produce well-supported intergeneric relationships for the eight New Caledonian diplodactylids in spite of a growing number of studies investigating them. New Zealand genera have proved somewhat easier to analyze. The group has correspondingly gone through several taxonomic revisions to reach the current order of genera proposed by Nielson et al. in 2011. Yet, a high amount of cryptic diversity remains unresolved, especially within Hoplodactylus. Australia genera such as Diplodactylus, Lucasium, Rhynchoedura and Strophurus are generally considered well-studied, with many of their intergeneric relationships strongly supported and resolved. The Pseudothecadactylus affinity to New Caledonian geckos has been informative and is under study, while Oedura are being increasingly examined. However, more work is still needed to understand the basal relationships and divergence of other "non-core" genera like Nebulifera, Amalosia, Hespeodura and Crenadactylus.

Multiple studies in all three endemic clades of the Diplodactylidae have suggested and confirmed that high cryptic diversity exists at the species level. Because undescribed diversity can have serious implications for not only evolutionary and ecological understanding, but also for effective conservation of the family, this is an issue to be resolved within the Diplodactylidae phylogeny. Endemic Gondwanan lineages, a diversity of habitats, and the relative isolation of the three Australian regions have allowed for a significant speciation of diplodactylids. In 2009 an additional 16 Diplodactylus species within the Australian radiation were described, while evidence of deep divergence within Crenadactylus revised the single nominal species Crenadactylus ocellatus into 10 distinct lineages in 2010. Likewise 16 new species in New Zealand were recognized in 2011. In 2014 another seven genetically distinct and morphologically diagnosable taxa were described in Australia, and two years later four additional species were added to Oedura. In 2020 four new species were reported in New Caledonia. Just within the past decade, diversity records within Diplodactylidae have increased substantially, from 54 species to almost 140 species. This is due in large part to improvement in taxon sampling and molecular analyses, as well as the growing recognition of the cryptic diversity that still exists within the family.

The following cladogram represents the structure of Diplodactylidae in a phylogenetic analysis by Skipwith et al., 2019.

- Diplodactylidae
  - - Pseudothecadactylus
    - New Caledonian geckos
      - Eurydactylodes
      - - - Oedodera
          - Dierogekko
        - - - Correlophus
            - - Rhacodactylus (paraphyletic)
              - Mniarogekko
          - - Paniegekko
            - Bavayia
  - - Crenadactylus
    - - New Zealand geckos
        - - Woodworthia (paraphyletic)
          - Hoplodactylus
        - - Tukutuku
          - - - Dactylocnemis
              - Mokopirirakau
            - - Toropuku
              - Naultinus
      - - - Hesperoedura
          - - Amalosia (paraphyletic)
            - Nebulifera
        - - Oedura
          - - Strophurus
            - - - Rhynchoedura
                - Lucasium
              - Diplodactylus

=== Origins ===
Although origins of the Diplodactylidae have long been debated, the Gondwanan vicariance hypothesis has generally supplanted most arguments for dispersal across land-bridges or by sea. The first gecko-wide genetic analysis found support for a split of Eastern Gondwanaland from Western Gondwanaland and evidence that Eastern Gondwanan lineages of Diplodactylidae, Pygopodidae and Carphodactylidae appear older than lineages in the Gekkonidae. These findings have been upheld and clarified in subsequent dating analyses. Most molecular divergence studies agree that diplodactylids were likely present prior to the final breakup of Australia and Antarctica with diversification of crown diplodactyloids occurring between the late Cretaceous or the earliest Paleogene periods. A recent phylogenomic analysis suggests independent colonization events to New Zealand and New Caledonia after the K-T extinction in the late Paleogene and early Neogene, respectively. Due to the range of these dispersals, and fossil evidence showing that New Zealand was likely submerged during the Oligocene as was New Caledonia during the Paleocene, it has been suggested that both the New Zealand and New Caledonian colonizations may have been a result of over-water dispersal events after all.

== Conservation ==
Of the approximately 149 species currently described, 30 are listed as Critically Endangered or Endangered, and 28 as Near Threatened or Vulnerable. Another three are listed as data deficient [as of October 2021].
