= Ross Allen Sadlier =

Australian herpetologist (born 1955)

- Born: 24 January 1955 (age 71)
- Education: Macquarie University
- Known for: Taxonomy of reptiles; description of numerous new species
- Scientific career
- Fields: Herpetology
- Workplaces: Australian Museum
- Author abbrev. (zoology): Sadlier

Ross Allen Sadlier (born 24 January 1955) is an Australian herpetologist. He is the Curator (Collection Manager) for Herpetology at the Australian Museum in Sydney.

== Biography ==
Sadlier began working in 1980 as a Technical Officer in the Herpetology Department of the Australian Museum and became Collection Manager in 1996. In 1986, he earned a bachelor's degree from Macquarie University and subsequently worked at the University of California, Berkeley.

He has conducted fieldwork in northern Australia, New South Wales, and on islands of the southwestern Pacific, and more recently in the rainforests of eastern Australia and New Caledonia, where he has also been involved in conservation studies.

Sadlier has published the original descriptions of 69 reptile species, in part in collaboration with Aaron M. Bauer.

== Eponyms ==
Two reptiles have been named in his honor: the skink Pygmaeascincus sadlieri and the subspecies Candoia paulsoni sadlieri.

== Selected publications ==
- with Gerry Swann and Glenn M. Shea (2004): A Field Guide to Reptiles of New South Wales. Reed New Holland.
- with Aaron M. Bauer and Ivan Ineich (2000): The Herpetofauna of New Caledonia. Ithaca, NY: Society for the Study of Amphibians and Reptiles (SSAR).
- with John Cann (2017): Freshwater Turtles of Australia. CSIRO Publishing.
