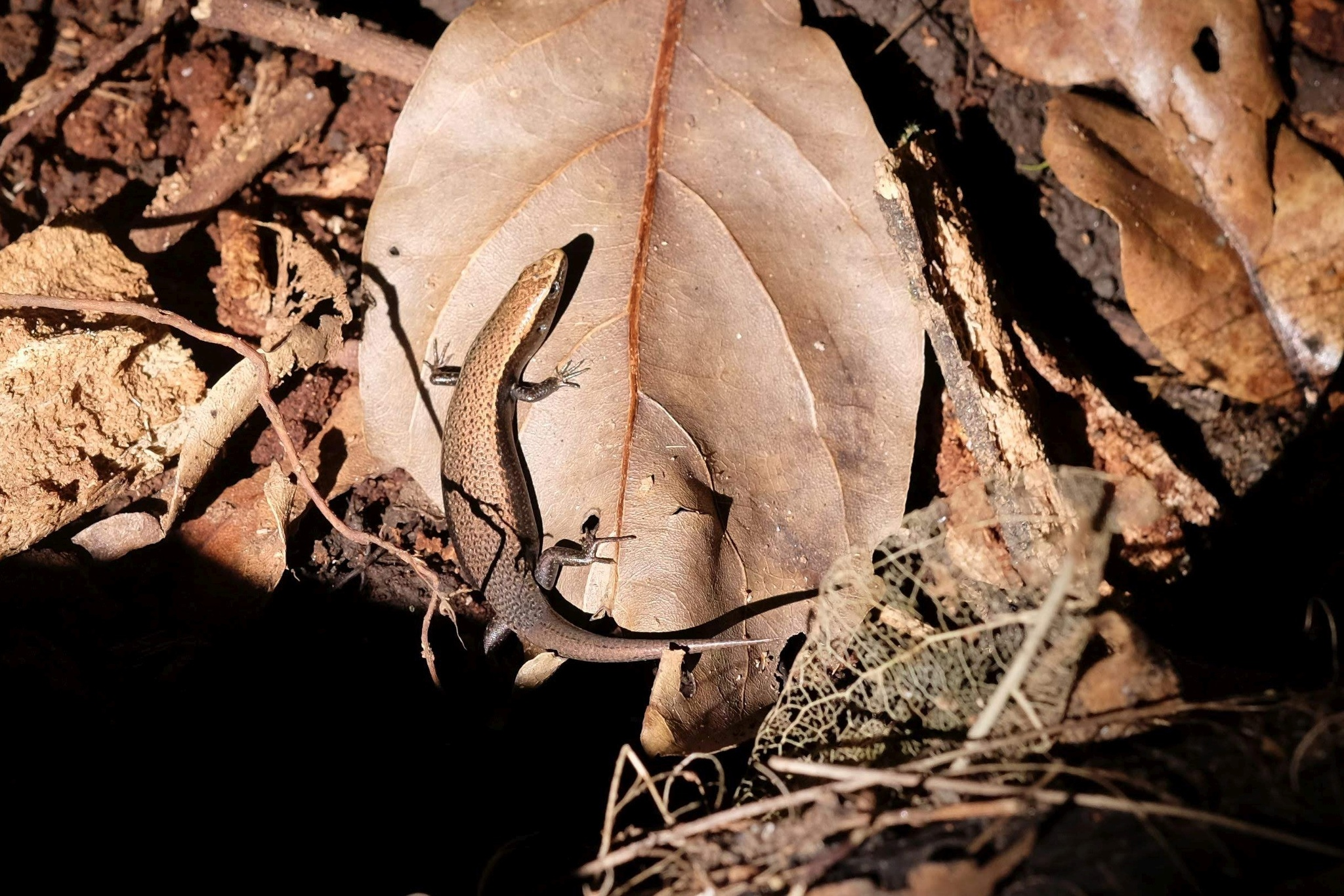
- Caledoniscincus atropunctatus photo

Scientific classification
- Kingdom: Animalia
- Phylum: Chordata
- Class: Reptilia
- Order: Squamata
- Family: Scincidae
- Subfamily: Eugongylinae
- Genus: Caledoniscincus; Sadlier, 1987

Species
- 14 species (see text)

= Caledoniscincus =

Genus of lizards

Caledoniscincus is a genus of lizards in the family Scincidae (skinks). The genus is endemic to New Caledonia.

== Species ==
The following 14 species are recognized as being valid:

- Caledoniscincus aquilonius Sadlier, Bauer & Colgan, 1999 – northern litter skink
- Caledoniscincus atropunctatus (Roux, 1913) – speckled litter skink
- Caledoniscincus auratus Sadlier, Bauer & Colgan, 1999 – Koumac litter skink
- Caledoniscincus austrocaledonicus (Bavay, 1869) – common litter skink
- Caledoniscincus chazeaui Sadlier, Bauer & Colgan, 1999 – Chazeau's litter skink
- Caledoniscincus constellatus Sadlier, A. Whitaker, Wood & Bauer, 2012
- Caledoniscincus cryptos Sadlier, Bauer & Colgan, 1999 – cryptic litter skink
- Caledoniscincus festivus (Roux, 1913) – giant litter skink
- Caledoniscincus haplorhinus (Günther, 1872) – Strand litter skink
- Caledoniscincus notialis Sadlier, S.A. Smith, Bauer & Wood, 2013 – southern litter skink
- Caledoniscincus orestes Sadlier, 1987 – Panié litter skink
- Caledoniscincus pelletieri Sadlier, A. Whitaker, Wood & Bauer, 2014 – Pelletier's litter skink
- Caledoniscincus renevieri Sadlier, Bauer & Colgan, 1999 – Renevier's litter skink
- Caledoniscincus terma Sadlier, Bauer & Colgan, 1999 – Mandjélia litter skink

Nota bene: A binomial authority in parentheses indicates that the species was originally described in a genus other than Caledoniscincus.
