= Lioscincus =

Scientific classification
- Kingdom: Animalia
- Phylum: Chordata
- Class: Reptilia
- Order: Squamata
- Family: Scincidae
- Subfamily: Eugongylinae
- Genus: Lioscincus; Bocage, 1873

Type species
- Lioscincus steindachneri Bocage, 1873

Genus of lizards

Lioscincus is a genus of skinks, lizards in the family Scincidae. The genus is endemic to New Caledonia.

== Species ==
There are two species that are recognized as being valid.

- Lioscincus steindachneri Bocage, 1873 – white-lipped forest skink, Steindachner's ground skink
- Lioscincus vivae Sadlier, Bauer, A. Whitaker & S.A. Smith, 2004
