= Correlophus belepensis =

Conservation status
- Critically Endangered (IUCN 3.1)

Scientific classification
- Kingdom: Animalia
- Phylum: Chordata
- Class: Reptilia
- Order: Squamata
- Suborder: Gekkota
- Family: Diplodactylidae
- Genus: Correlophus
- Species: C. belepensis

Binomial name
- Correlophus belepensis Bauer, A. Whitaker, Sadlier, & Jackman, 2012

Species of lizard

Correlophus belepensis, commonly known as Belep Island Giant Gecko named after Belep, a commune in New Calendonia, is a species of geckos endemic to New Caledonia. They can reach a snout–vent length of 100 mm (5 inches). They have a similar appearance to their sister taxon, Correlophus ciliatus. They only occur in a 8 kilometer (5 mile) area on the province of Belep, on the Art Island, in which they are found on hard lateritic soils covered with closed or paraforestier forest. Their involvement in the illegal French pet trade, along with Electric ants, and habitat loss, are the primary reasons for their endangerment.
