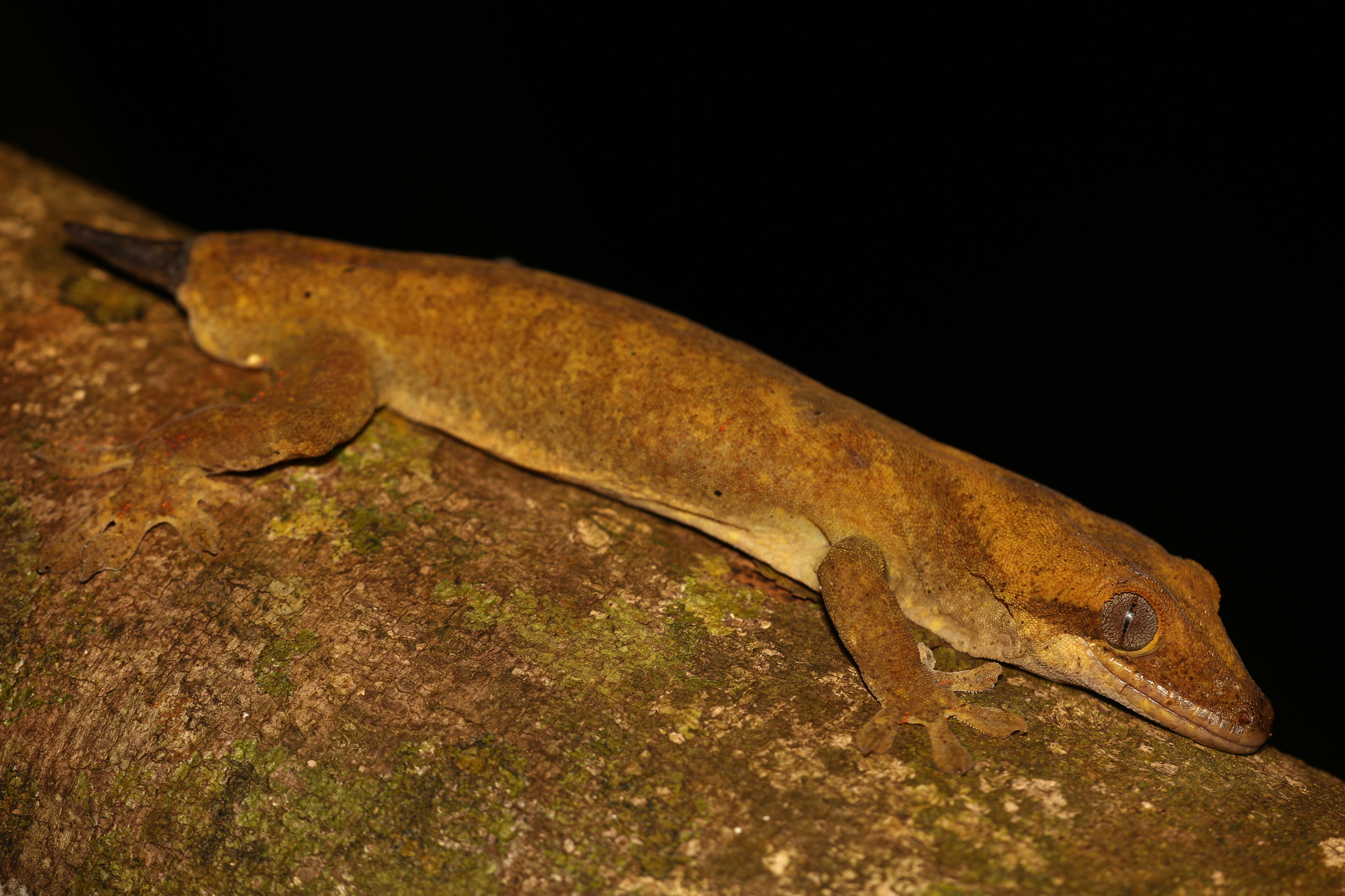

Conservation status
- Vulnerable (IUCN 3.1)

Scientific classification
- Kingdom: Animalia
- Phylum: Chordata
- Class: Reptilia
- Order: Squamata
- Suborder: Gekkota
- Family: Diplodactylidae
- Genus: Correlophus
- Species: C. sarasinorum

Binomial name
- Correlophus sarasinorum (Roux, 1913)

Synonyms
- Rhacodactylus sarasinorum Roux, 1913; Correlophus sarasinorum — Bauer et al., 2012

= Correlophus sarasinorum =

Species of lizard

Correlophus sarasinorum, also called commonly Roux's giant gecko, Sarasins' giant gecko, is a species of lizard in the family Diplodactylidae. The species is native to the southern portions of the outlying New Caledonian island of Grande Terre.

== Etymology ==
The specific name, sarasinorum (masculine, genitive, plural), is in honor of Swiss zoologists Karl Friedrich Sarasin and Paul Benedict Sarasin, who were cousins.

== Conservation status ==
C. sarasinorum is currently being evaluated by CITES for protective status and is considered vulnerable to extinction in many herpetological circles. It has been found only in six locales in its native habitat.

== Description ==
Since there is a considerable variation in snout-to-vent length (SVL) of C. sarasinorum, which ranges from 3.5 to 5.5 inches (9 to 14 centimeters), it has been suggested that more than one subspecies exists; there is no universal consensus on this point. The basic color of the suras gecko is brown to gray. Two color patterns exist. A white spotted version is the recessive trait, and a white "V" pattern is the dominant trait. The gecko's appearance has often been described as similar to a large Correlophus ciliatus, with larger eyes.

== Habitat ==
The preferred natural habitats of C. sarasinorum are forest and shrubland, at altitudes of 20–600 m (66–1,969 ft).

== Behavior ==
C. sarasinorum is nocturnal, and less arboreal than the other Rhacodactylus (sensu lato) geckos. It is often found hiding under the leaf litter or under loose bark. This species has an animal instinct of sleeping on top of plants or in small trees face up preventing the common FTS (Floppy Tail Syndrome) caused by the gecko sleeping upside down.

== Diet ==
C. sarasinorum is an omnivore and is also considered to be frugivorous. In the wild it eats insects and fruit.

== Reproduction ==
The female C. sarasinorum lays two eggs which are buried in a soft, damp substrate. The eggs hatch 60–90 days after being laid.

== In captivity ==
The species C. sarasinorum is sometimes seen in captivity.
