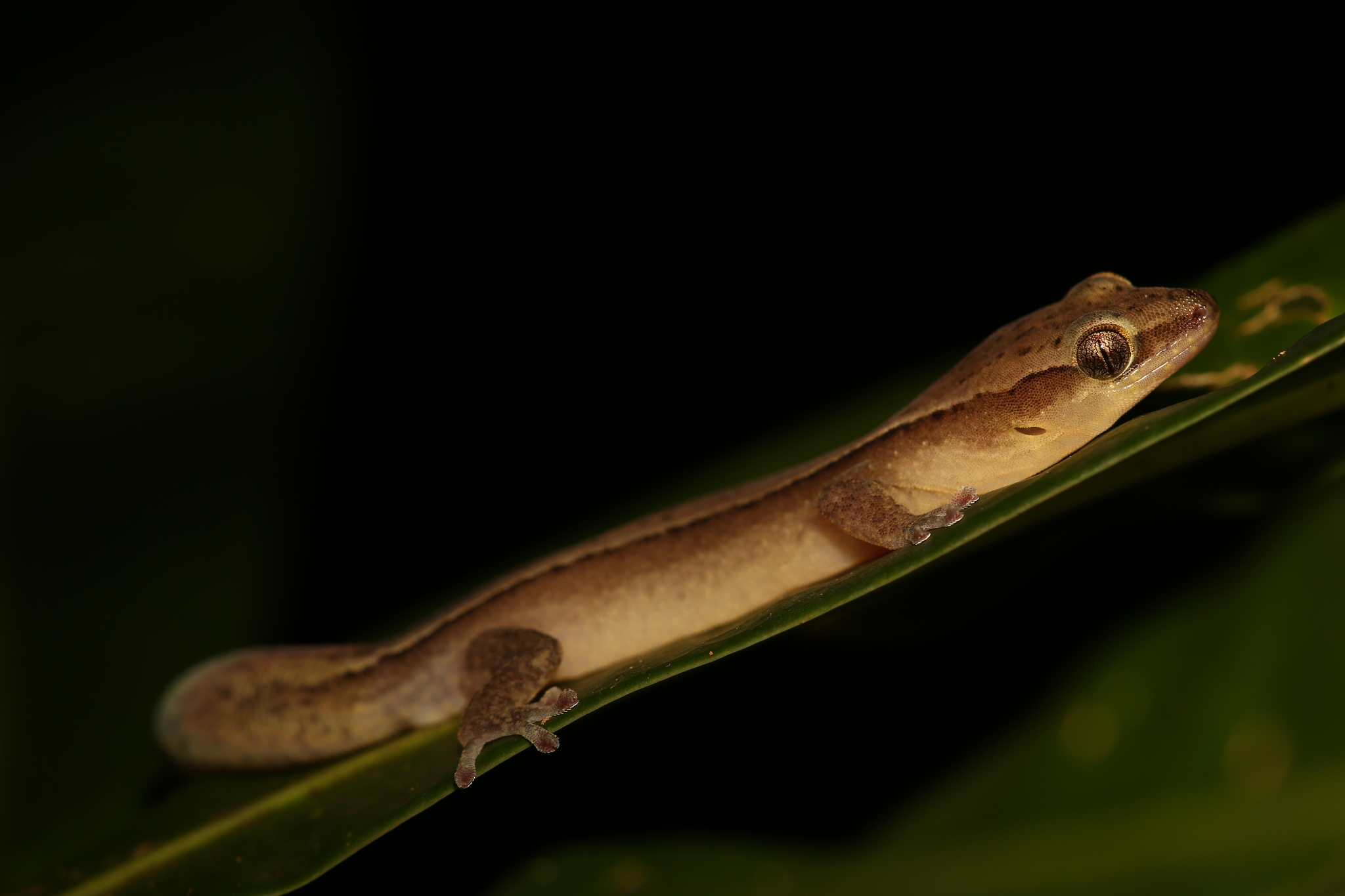
- Dierogekko nehoueensis

Scientific classification
- Kingdom: Animalia
- Phylum: Chordata
- Class: Reptilia
- Order: Squamata
- Suborder: Gekkota
- Family: Diplodactylidae
- Genus: Dierogekko; Bauer, Jackman, Sadlier, & A. Whitaker, 2006

= Dierogekko =

Genus of lizards

Dierogekko is a genus of geckos in the family Diplodactylidae. The genus is endemic to the northwest portion of New Caledonia. They are sometimes known commonly as the striped geckos or the New Caledonian geckos. Dierogekko are small geckos with simple, granular scales and subdued patterning of broad longitudinal stripes or spots. They are similar in overall appearance and habit to closely related geckos in the genera Bavayia and Oedodera, and the type species D. validiclavis was once referred to Bavayia.

Dierogekko species occur in small, fragmented areas of humid forests and dry maquis shrubland in the ultramafic massifs of Province Nord. They are among the most threatened lizards in the world; of the nine species, five are critically endangered, three are endangered, and one is data deficient and known from only a single specimen. Threats include habitat destruction by operational and planned nickel mines, and predation, competition, or habitat degradation by introduced species (rats, cats, deer, pigs, fire ants, Hemidactylus frenatus).

== Species ==
The genus Dierogekko contains nine species recognized as being valid:

- Dierogekko baaba Skipwith, Jackman, Whitaker, Bauer & Sadlier, 2014
- Dierogekko inexpectatus Bauer, Jackman, Sadlier & Whitaker, 2006
- Dierogekko insularis Bauer, Jackman, Sadlier & Whitaker, 2006 – Islands striped gecko
- Dierogekko kaalaensis Bauer, Jackman, Sadlier & Whitaker, 2006 – Kaala striped gecko
- Dierogekko koniambo Bauer, Jackman, Sadlier & Whitaker, 2006 – Koniambo striped gecko
- Dierogekko nehoueensis Bauer, Jackman, Sadlier & Whitaker, 2006 – striped gecko
- Dierogekko poumensis Bauer, Jackman, Sadlier & Whitaker, 2006 – Poum striped gecko
- Dierogekko thomaswhitei Bauer, Jackman, Sadlier & Whitaker, 2006 –Taom striped gecko
- Dierogekko validiclavis (Sadlier, 1988) – bold-striped gecko
