= Marmorosphax =

Scientific classification
- Kingdom: Animalia
- Phylum: Chordata
- Class: Reptilia
- Order: Squamata
- Family: Scincidae
- Subfamily: Eugongylinae
- Genus: Marmorosphax; Sadlier, 1986

Genus of lizards

Marmorosphax, is a genus of skinks native to New Caledonia.

== Species ==
Listed alphabetically by specific name.

- Marmorosphax boulinda Sadlier, Smith, Bauer, & Whitaker, 2009
- Marmorosphax kaala Sadlier, Smith, Bauer, & Whitaker, 2009
- Marmorosphax montana Sadlier & Bauer, 2000
- Marmorosphax taom Sadlier, Smith, Bauer, & Whitaker, 2009
- Marmorosphax tricolor (Bavay, 1869) – marble-throated skink

Nota bene: A binomial authority in parentheses indicates that the species was originally described in a genus other than Marmorosphax.
