= Dierogekko insularis =

Conservation status
- Endangered (IUCN 3.1)

Scientific classification
- Kingdom: Animalia
- Phylum: Chordata
- Class: Reptilia
- Order: Squamata
- Suborder: Gekkota
- Family: Diplodactylidae
- Genus: Dierogekko
- Species: D. insularis

Binomial name
- Dierogekko insularis Bauer, Jackman, Sadlier, & A. Whitaker, 2006

Species of lizard

Dierogekko insularis, also known as the Islands striped gecko, is a gecko endemic to Grande Terre in New Caledonia.
