= Caledoniscincus atropunctatus =

Conservation status
- Least Concern (IUCN 3.1)

Scientific classification
- Kingdom: Animalia
- Phylum: Chordata
- Class: Reptilia
- Order: Squamata
- Family: Scincidae
- Genus: Caledoniscincus
- Species: C. atropunctatus

Binomial name
- Caledoniscincus atropunctatus (Roux, 1913)
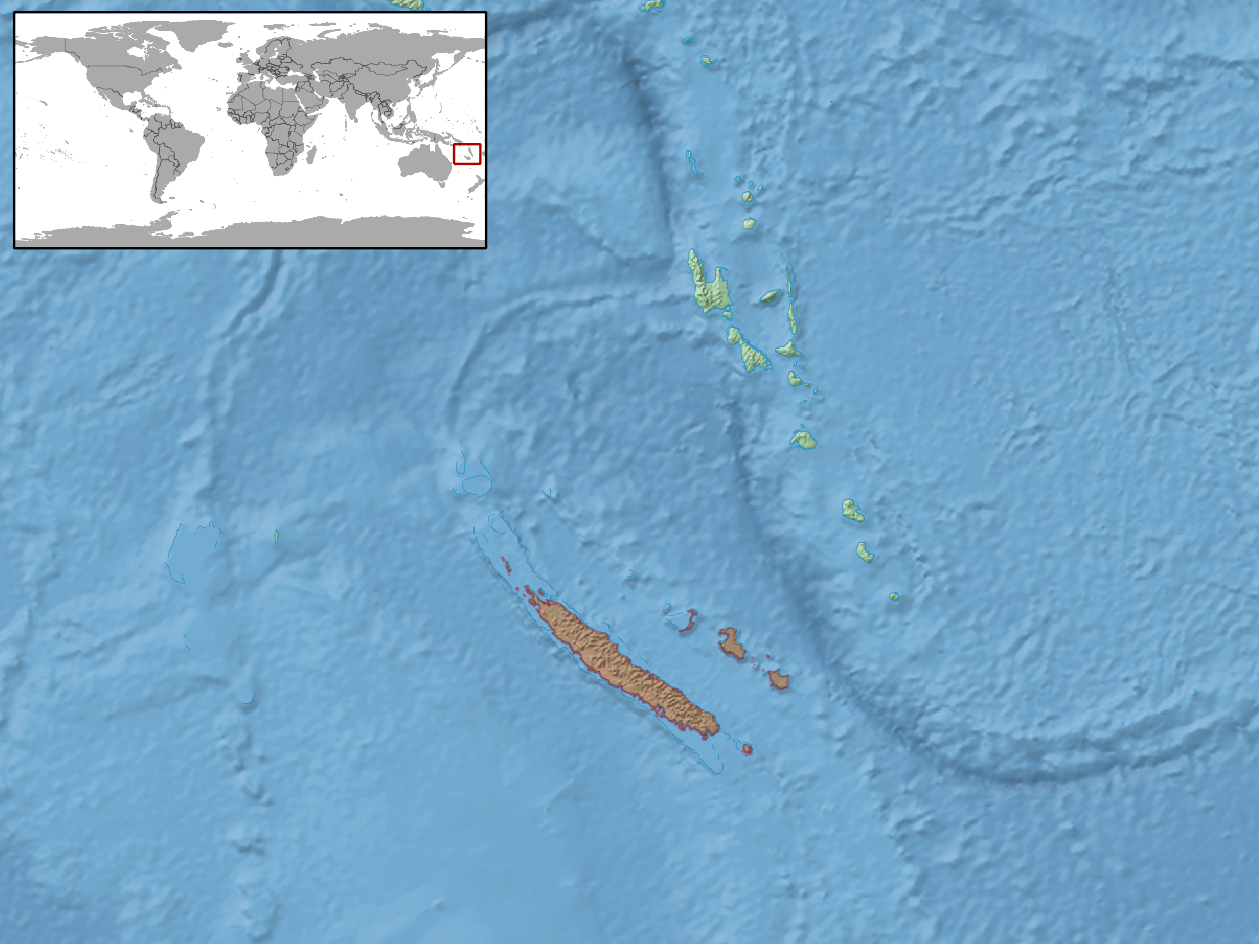

Species of lizard

Caledoniscincus atropunctatus, the speckled litter skink, is a species of lizard in the family Scincidae. It is endemic to New Caledonia.
