= Caledoniscincus terma =

Conservation status
- Data Deficient (IUCN 3.1)

Scientific classification
- Kingdom: Animalia
- Phylum: Chordata
- Class: Reptilia
- Order: Squamata
- Family: Scincidae
- Genus: Caledoniscincus
- Species: C. terma

Binomial name
- Caledoniscincus terma Sadlier, Bauer, & Colgan, 1999
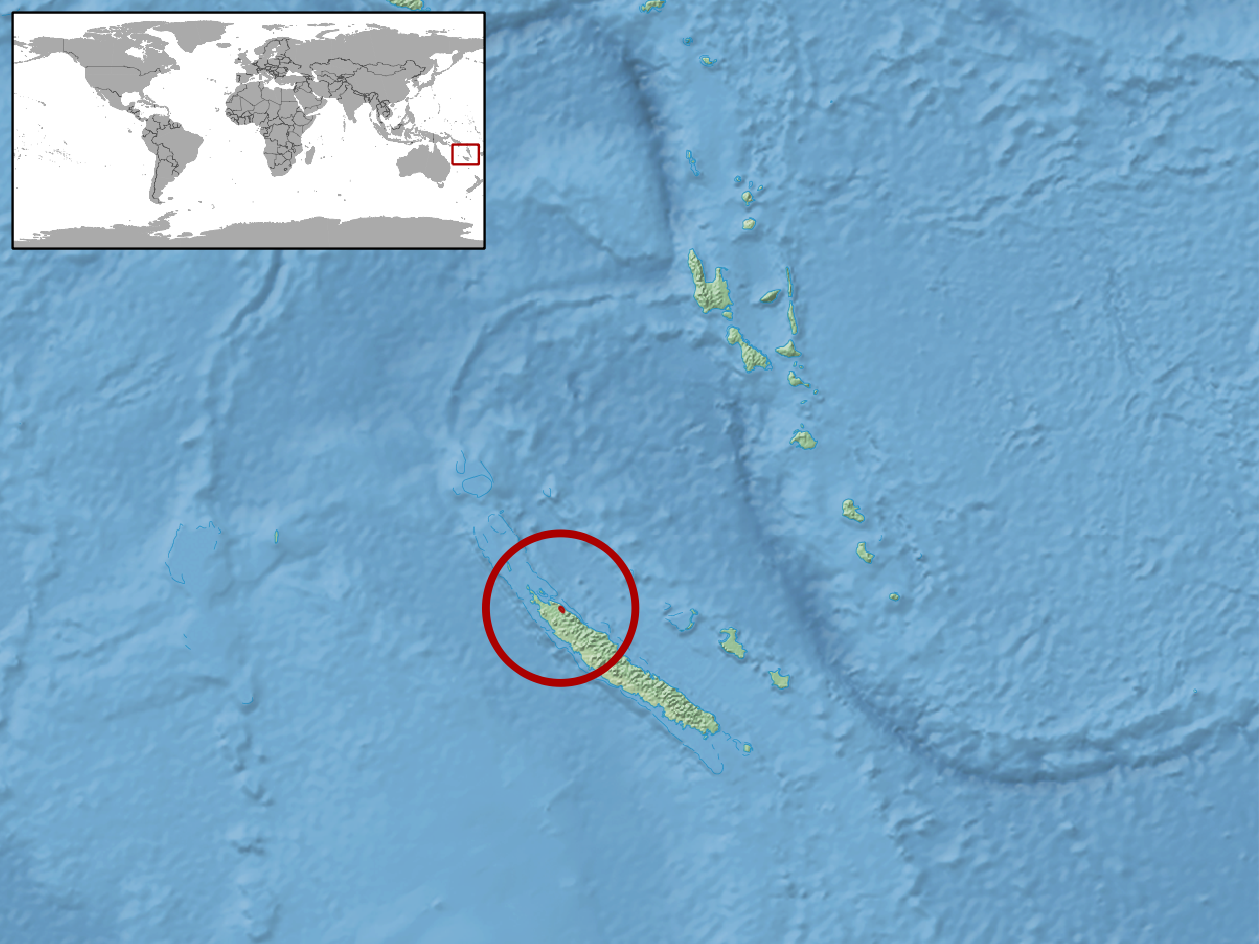

Species of lizard

Caledoniscincus terma, the Mandjélia litter skink, is a species of lizard in the family Scincidae. It is endemic to New Caledonia.
