= Lioscincus vivae =

Conservation status
- Critically Endangered (IUCN 3.1)

Scientific classification
- Kingdom: Animalia
- Phylum: Chordata
- Class: Reptilia
- Order: Squamata
- Family: Scincidae
- Genus: Lioscincus
- Species: L. vivae

Binomial name
- Lioscincus vivae Sadlier, Bauer, Whitaker & S.A. Smith, 2004
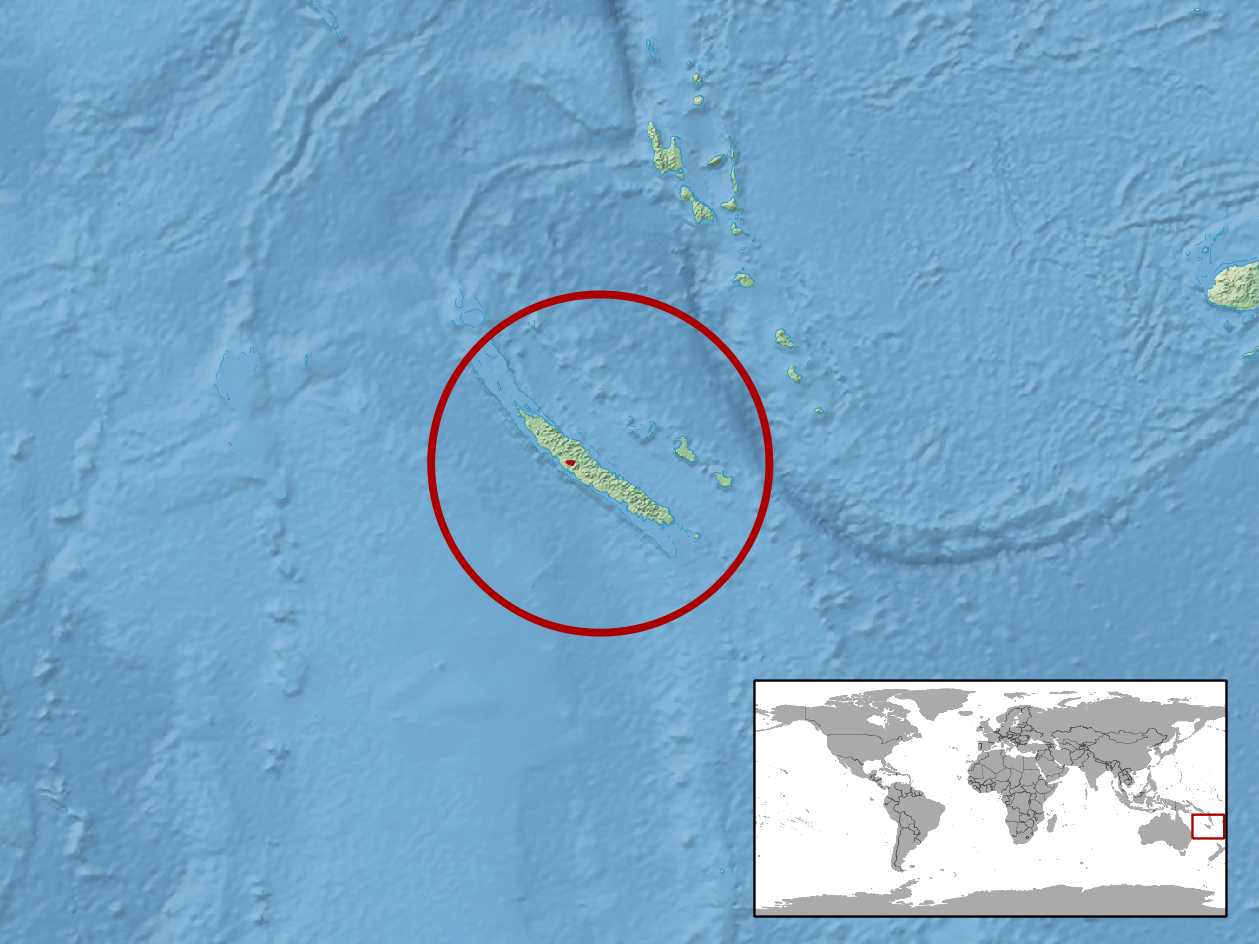

Species of lizard

Lioscincus vivae is a species of lizard in the family Scincidae. The species is endemic to New Caledonia.

== Etymology ==
The specific name, vivae, is in honor of "Kiwi" botanical collector Vivienne "Viv" Whitaker, who collected the holotype of this species, and is the wife of one of its describers, Anthony Whitaker.

== Habitat ==
The preferred natural habitats of L. vivae are forest and shrubland, at altitudes of 500–1,000 m (1,600–3,300 ft).

== Reproduction ==
The mode of reproduction of L. vivae is unknown. It may be oviparous or viviparous.
