= Caledoniscincus festivus =

Conservation status
- Least Concern (IUCN 3.1)

Scientific classification
- Kingdom: Animalia
- Phylum: Chordata
- Class: Reptilia
- Order: Squamata
- Family: Scincidae
- Genus: Caledoniscincus
- Species: C. festivus

Binomial name
- Caledoniscincus festivus (Roux, 1913)
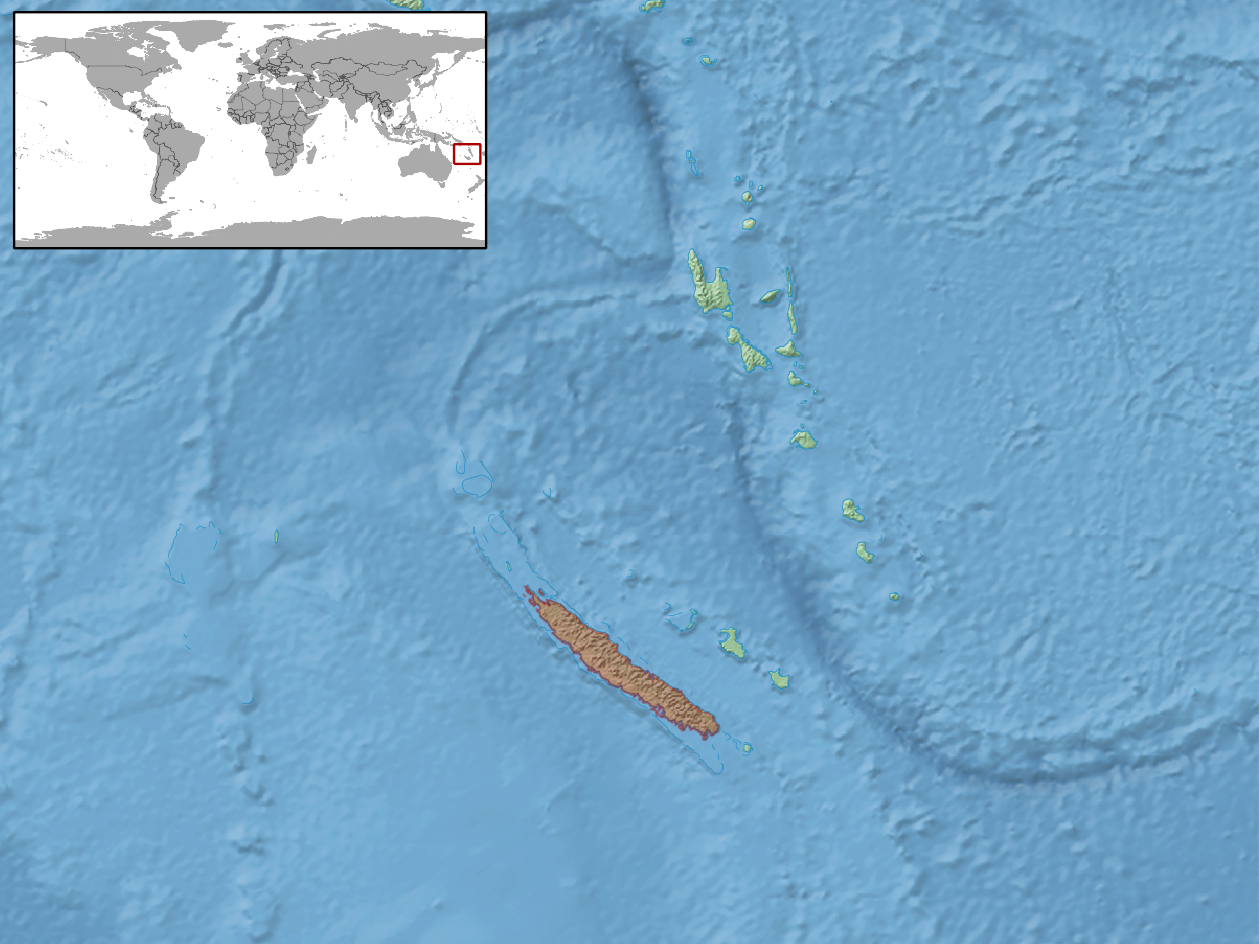

Synonyms
- Lygosoma austro-caledonicum subsp. festivum Roux, 1913; Lygosoma austro-caledonicum subsp. intermedium Roux, 1913

Species of lizard

Caledoniscincus festivus, the giant litter skink, is a species of lizard in the family Scincidae. It is endemic to New Caledonia.
