= Caledoniscincus cryptos =

Conservation status
- Data Deficient (IUCN 3.1)

Scientific classification
- Kingdom: Animalia
- Phylum: Chordata
- Class: Reptilia
- Order: Squamata
- Family: Scincidae
- Genus: Caledoniscincus
- Species: C. cryptos

Binomial name
- Caledoniscincus cryptos Sadlier, Bauer, & Colgan, 1999
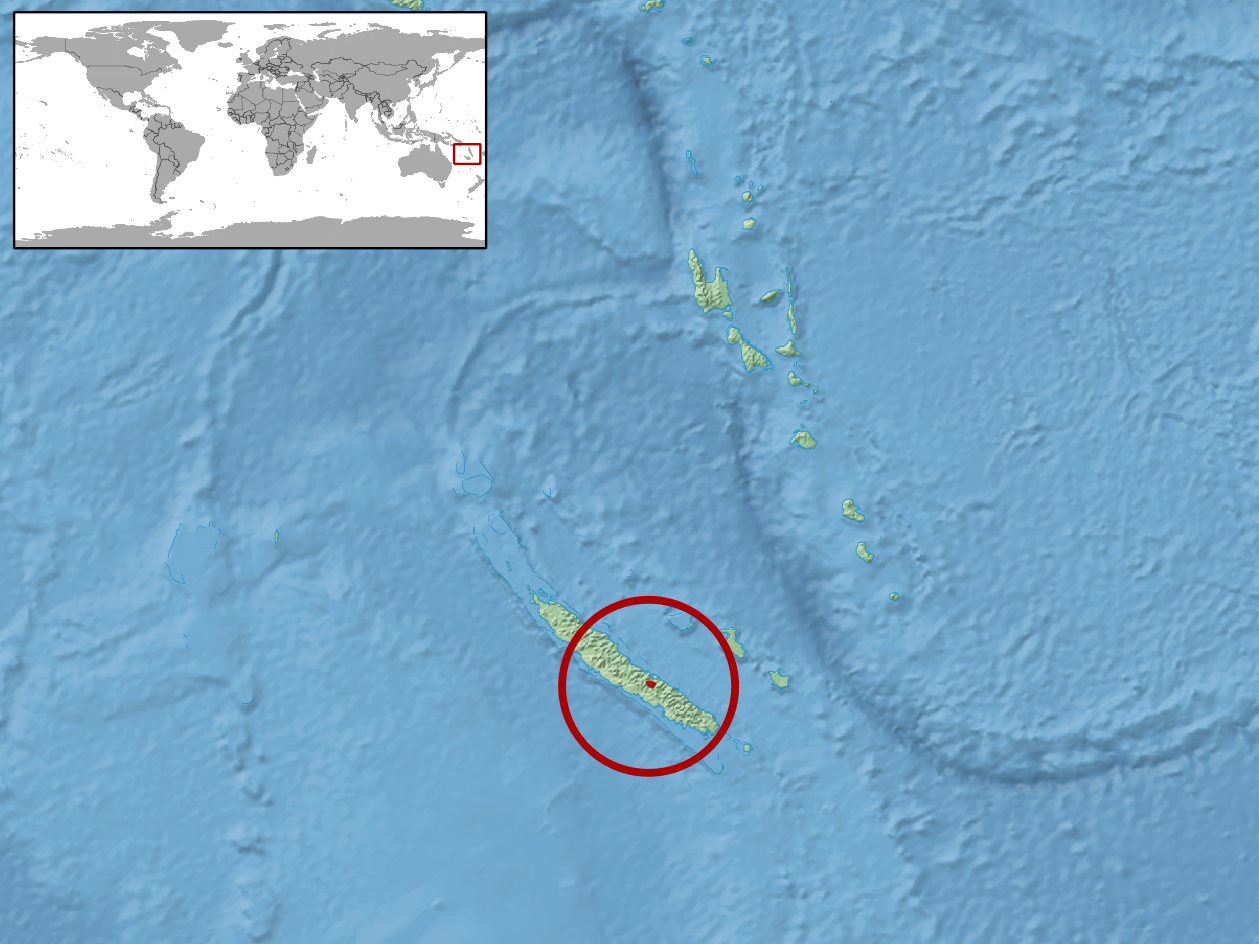

Species of lizard

Caledoniscincus cryptos, the cryptic litter skink, is a species of lizard in the family Scincidae. It is endemic to New Caledonia.

Caledoniscincus cryptos was described as a new species in 1999 by herpetologists Ross A. Sadlier, Aaron M. Bauer and David J. Colgan. Its recognition was based primarily on genetic differences from other members of the genus Caledoniscincus, including morphologically similar species. The specific name cryptos is derived from the Greek word for "hidden" or "concealed", referring to the species' identification through genetic analysis.
