= Caledoniscincus constellatus =

Conservation status
- Critically Endangered (IUCN 3.1)

Scientific classification
- Kingdom: Animalia
- Phylum: Chordata
- Class: Reptilia
- Order: Squamata
- Family: Scincidae
- Genus: Caledoniscincus
- Species: C. constellatus

Binomial name
- Caledoniscincus constellatus Sadlier, Whitaker, Wood, & Bauer, 2012
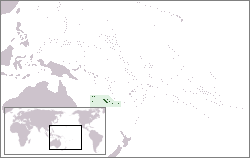
- Location map of New Caledonia

Species of lizard

Caledoniscincus constellatus is a critically endangered species of lizard in the taxonomic family Scincidae. C. constellatus is endemic to the northwest region of New Caledonia and the central region of New Caledonia. Adult males of the species are 46 to 57 millimetres (1.8 to 2.2 in) in length while adult females of the species are 57 mm (2.2 in) in length. Caledoniscincus constellatus has a broad pale mid-lateral stripe on its body that distinguishes it from other Caledoniscincus species with both adult sexes having a bright yellow ventral color.

Caledoniscincus constellatus prefers acacia tree shrubland on coastal hills and in dense open maquis of the province Nord, New Caledonia usually of an elevation of 0 to 400 metres (0 to 1,310 ft). The loss of the acacia tree shrublands and the open maquis is resulting in the extinction of the species. The introduction of animals such as deer and domestic pigs along with increased wildfires and nickel mining also helped in the extinction of the species putting C. constellatus in critical endangerment on the IUCN Red List. The population is severely fragmented with the species estimated to occupy 8 square kilometres (3.1 sq mi) of space and is decreasing but the rate of decreasing is unknown because the population number is unknown. Caledoniscincus constellatus was discovered in the year 2012 by Sadlier, Whitaker, Wood, and Bauer. The holotype of Caledoniscincus constellatus is MNHN 2011.0228.
