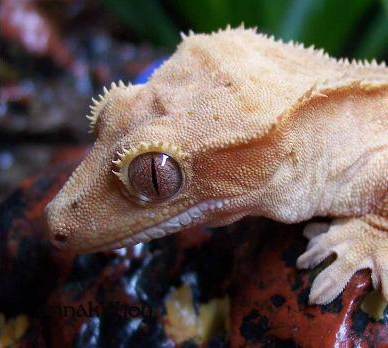
- Correlophus ciliatus, the crested gecko

Scientific classification
- Kingdom: Animalia
- Phylum: Chordata
- Class: Reptilia
- Order: Squamata
- Suborder: Gekkota
- Family: Diplodactylidae
- Genus: Correlophus; Guichenot, 1866

= Correlophus =

Genus of lizards

Correlophus is a genus of lizards in the family Diplodactylidae that is endemic to New Caledonia. Correlophus ciliatus and C. sarasinorum were formerly described as members of the Rhacodactylus genus until the discovery of C. belepensis in 2012.

== Species ==
It includes three species:

Image	Scientific name	Distribution
	Correlophus belepensis Bauer et al., 2012	New Caledonia
	Correlophus ciliatus Guichenot, 1866 (formerly included in Rhacodactylus)	New Caledonia.
	Correlophus sarasinorum Roux, 1913 (formerly included in Rhacodactylus)	New Caledonia.
