= Marmorosphax montana =

Conservation status
- Endangered (IUCN 3.1)

Scientific classification
- Kingdom: Animalia
- Phylum: Chordata
- Class: Reptilia
- Order: Squamata
- Family: Scincidae
- Genus: Marmorosphax
- Species: M. montana

Binomial name
- Marmorosphax montana Sadlier & Bauer, 2000
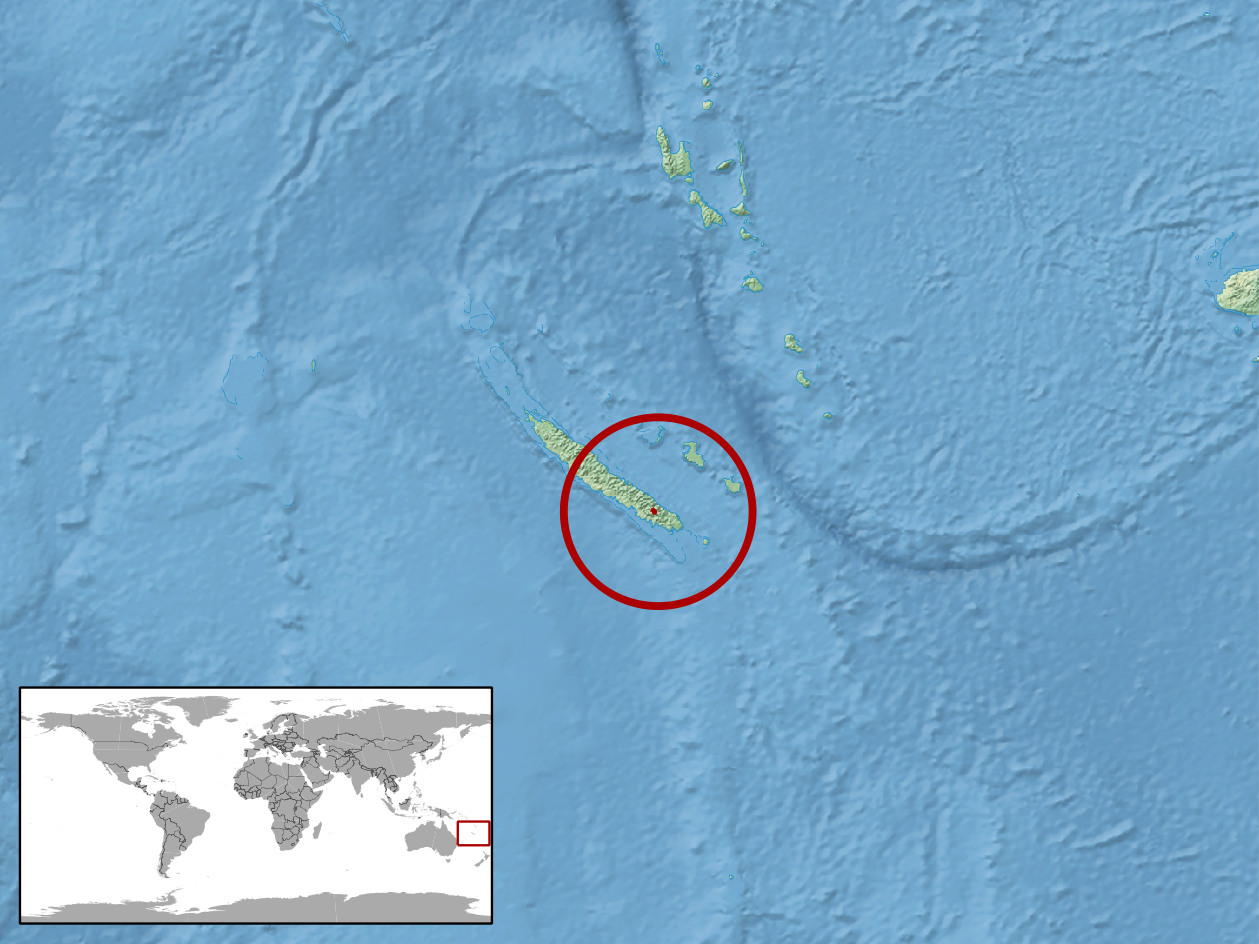

Species of lizard

Marmorosphax montana is a species of skink found in New Caledonia.
