= White-bellied skink =

Conservation status
- Critically Endangered (IUCN 3.1)

Scientific classification
- Kingdom: Animalia
- Phylum: Chordata
- Class: Reptilia
- Order: Squamata
- Family: Scincidae
- Genus: Oligosoma
- Species: O. hoparatea

Binomial name
- Oligosoma hoparatea Whitaker, Chapple, Hitchmough, Lettink, & Patterson, 2018
- Distribution of Oligosoma hoparatea on a map of the South Island Known native range

Species of skink

The white-bellied skink (Oligosoma hoparatea) is a species of skink found in the South Island of New Zealand.
