= Dierogekko thomaswhitei =

Conservation status
- Critically Endangered (IUCN 3.1)

Scientific classification
- Kingdom: Animalia
- Phylum: Chordata
- Class: Reptilia
- Order: Squamata
- Suborder: Gekkota
- Family: Diplodactylidae
- Genus: Dierogekko
- Species: D. thomaswhitei

Binomial name
- Dierogekko thomaswhitei Bauer, Jackman, Sadlier & A. Whitaker, 2006

Species of lizard

Dierogekko thomaswhitei, also known commonly as White's nimble gecko and the Taom striped gecko, is a species of lizard in the family Diplodactylidae. The species is endemic to New Caledonia.

== Etymology ==
The specific name, thomaswhitei, is in honor of "Dr. Thomas White".

== Geographic range ==
D. thomaswhitei is found on the island of Grande Terre, in North Province, New Caledonia.

== Habitat ==
The preferred natural habitats of D. thomaswhitei are forest and shrubland, at altitudes of 300–1,000 m (980–3,280 ft).

== Description ==
Relatively large for its genus, D. thomaswhitei may attain a snout-to-vent length (SVL) of 4.5 cm (1.8 in).

== Reproduction ==
D. thomaswhitei is oviparous.
