= Marmorosphax boulinda =

Conservation status
- Vulnerable (IUCN 3.1)

Scientific classification
- Kingdom: Animalia
- Phylum: Chordata
- Class: Reptilia
- Order: Squamata
- Family: Scincidae
- Genus: Marmorosphax
- Species: M. boulinda

Binomial name
- Marmorosphax boulinda Sadlier, Smith, Bauer, & Whitaker, 2009
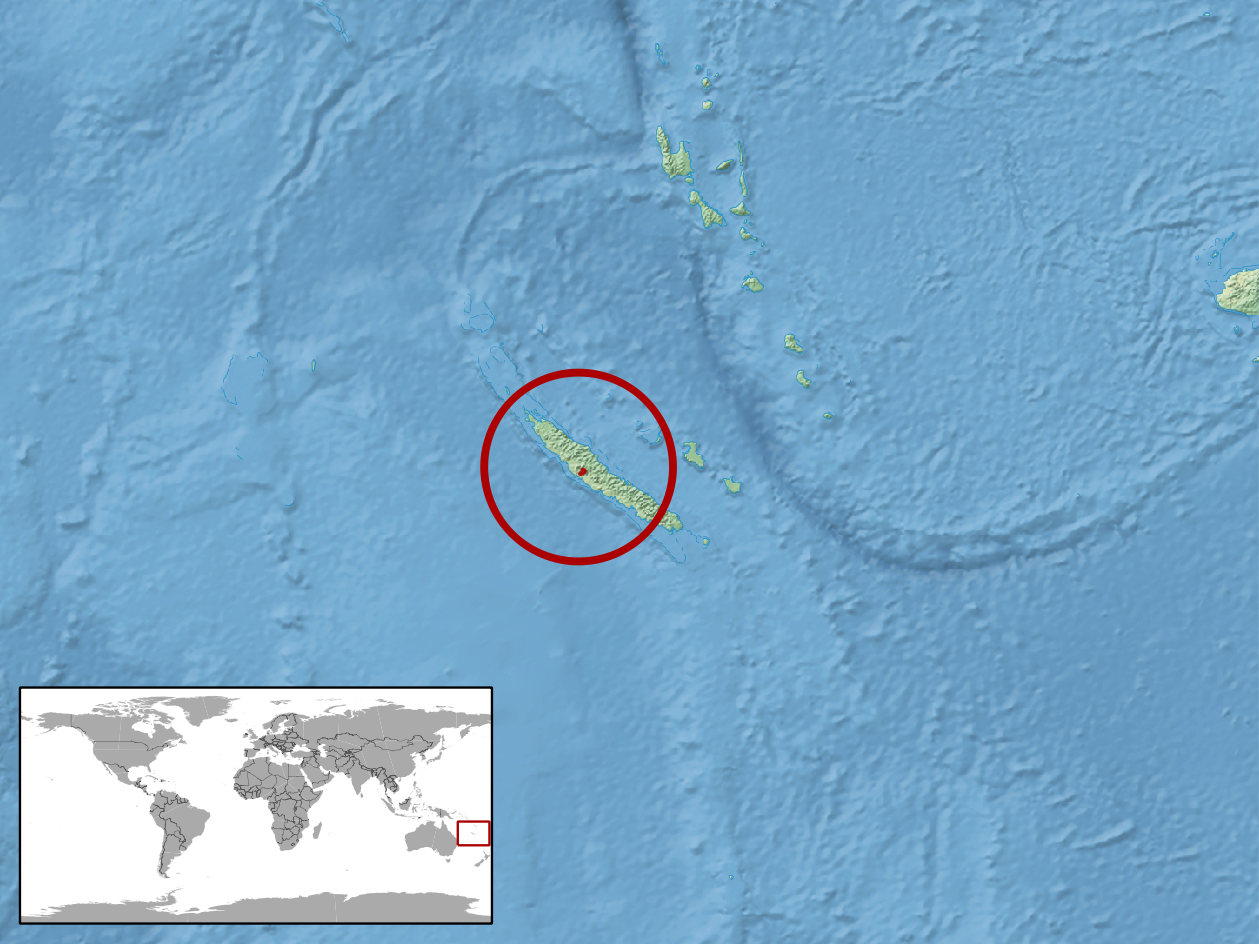

Species of lizard

Marmorosphax boulinda is a species of skink found in New Caledonia.
