= Dierogekko baaba =

Conservation status
- Data Deficient (IUCN 3.1)

Scientific classification
- Kingdom: Animalia
- Phylum: Chordata
- Class: Reptilia
- Order: Squamata
- Suborder: Gekkota
- Family: Diplodactylidae
- Genus: Dierogekko
- Species: D. baaba

Binomial name
- Dierogekko baaba Skipwith, Jackman, A. Whitaker, Bauer, & Sadlier, 2014

Species of lizard

Dierogekko baaba also known as Grande Terre striped gecko, is a gecko endemic to Grande Terre in New Caledonia.
