= Dierogekko kaalaensis =

Conservation status
- Critically Endangered (IUCN 3.1)

Scientific classification
- Kingdom: Animalia
- Phylum: Chordata
- Class: Reptilia
- Order: Squamata
- Suborder: Gekkota
- Family: Diplodactylidae
- Genus: Dierogekko
- Species: D. kaalaensis

Binomial name
- Dierogekko kaalaensis Bauer, Jackman, Sadlier, & A. Whitaker, 2006

Species of lizard

Dierogekko kaalaensis, also known as the Kaala striped gecko, is a gecko endemic to Grande Terre in New Caledonia.
