= Caledoniscincus notialis =

Conservation status
- Near Threatened (IUCN 3.1)

Scientific classification
- Kingdom: Animalia
- Phylum: Chordata
- Class: Reptilia
- Order: Squamata
- Family: Scincidae
- Genus: Caledoniscincus
- Species: C. notialis

Binomial name
- Caledoniscincus notialis Sadlier, Smith, Bauer, & Wood, 2013

Species of lizard

Caledoniscincus notialis, the southern litter skink, is a species of lizard in the family Scincidae. It is endemic to New Caledonia.
