= Lioscincus steindachneri =

Conservation status
- Endangered (IUCN 3.1)

Scientific classification
- Kingdom: Animalia
- Phylum: Chordata
- Class: Reptilia
- Order: Squamata
- Family: Scincidae
- Genus: Lioscincus
- Species: L. steindachneri

Binomial name
- Lioscincus steindachneri Bocage, 1873
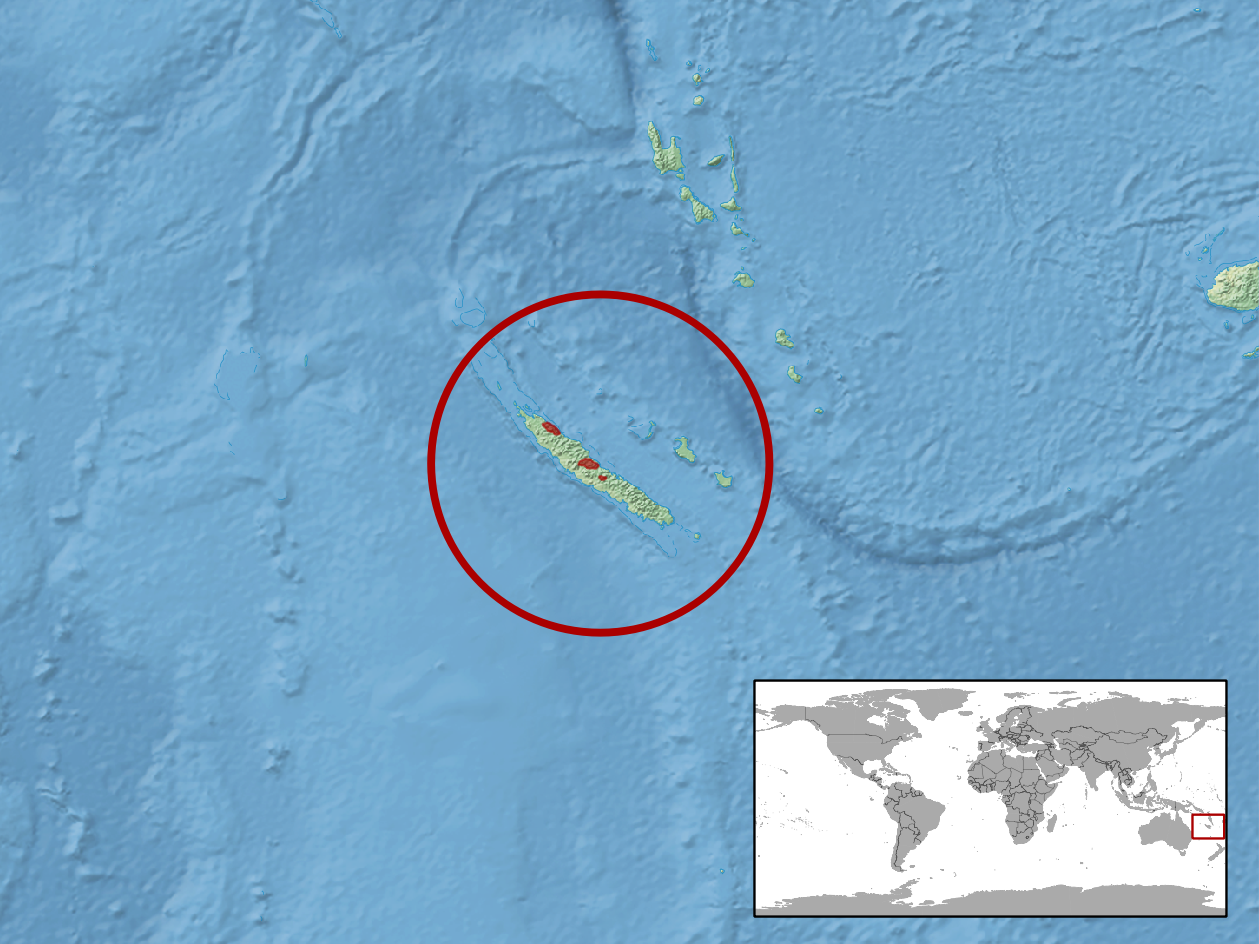

Synonyms
- Lioscincus steindachneri Bocage, 1873; Lygosoma (Leiolopisma) steindachneri — M.A. Smith, 1937; Leiolopisma steindachneri — Greer, 1974; Lioscincus steindachneri — Bauer & Sadlier, 1993

Species of lizard

Lioscincus steindachneri, also known commonly as the white-lipped forest skink or Steindachner's ground skink, is a species of lizard in the family Scincidae. The species is endemic to New Caledonia.

== Etymology ==
The specific name, steindachneri, is in honor of Austrian herpetologist Franz Steindachner.

== Habitat ==
The preferred natural habitat of L. steindachneri is moist forest, at altitudes of 200–1,110 m (660–3,640 ft).

== Reproduction ==
The mode of reproduction of L. steindachneri is unknown. It may be oviparous or viviparous.
