= Caledoniscincus renevieri =

Conservation status
- Endangered (IUCN 3.1)

Scientific classification
- Kingdom: Animalia
- Phylum: Chordata
- Class: Reptilia
- Order: Squamata
- Family: Scincidae
- Genus: Caledoniscincus
- Species: C. renevieri

Binomial name
- Caledoniscincus renevieri Sadlier, Bauer, & Colgan, 1999
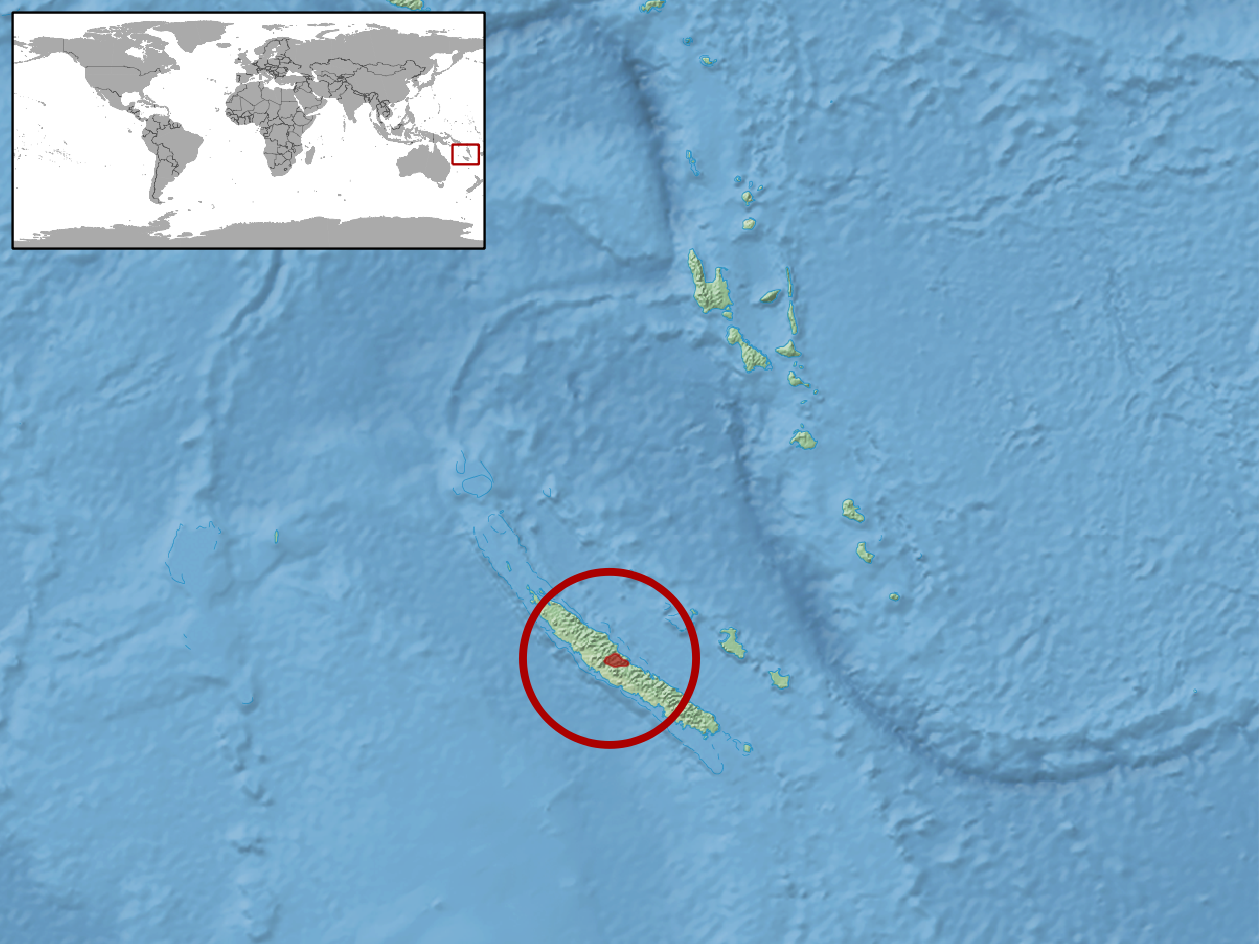

Species of lizard

Caledoniscincus renevieri, or Renevier's litter skink, is a species of lizard in the family Scincidae. It is endemic to New Caledonia.
