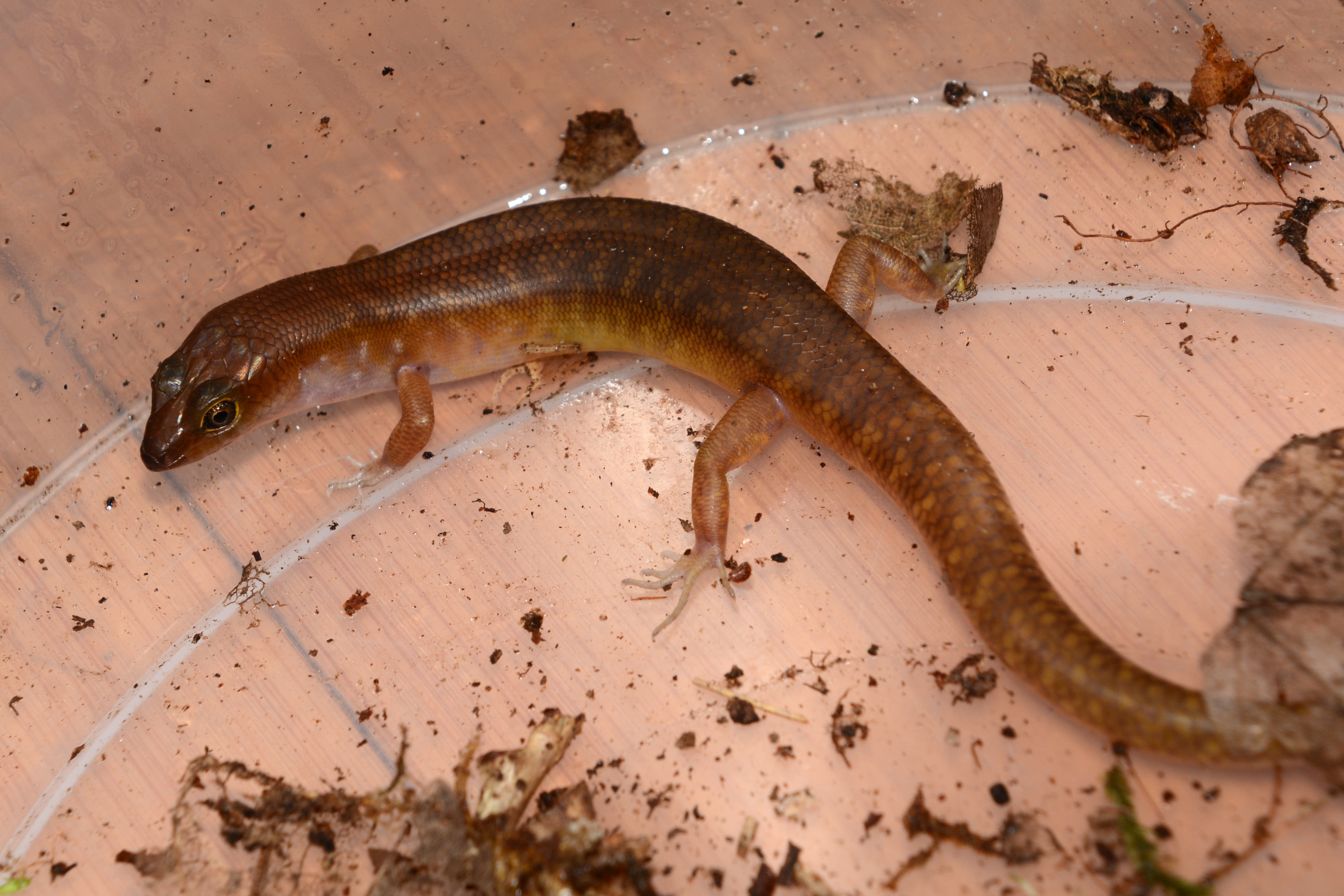
- Kanakysaurus viviparus

Scientific classification
- Kingdom: Animalia
- Phylum: Chordata
- Class: Reptilia
- Order: Squamata
- Family: Scincidae
- Subfamily: Eugongylinae
- Genus: Kanakysaurus; Sadlier, Whitaker, Bauer, & Smith, 2004

Species
- 2 sp., see text

= Kanakysaurus =

Genus of lizards

Kanakysaurus is a genus of skinks.

== Species ==
The following 2 species, listed alphabetically by specific name, are recognized as being valid: They are endemic to New Caledonia.

- Kanakysaurus viviparus Sadlier, Whitaker, Bauer, & Smith, 2004
- Kanakysaurus zebratus Sadlier, Smith, Whitaker, & Bauer, 2008

Nota bene: A binomial authority in parentheses indicates that the species was originally described in a genus other than Kanakysaurus.
