= Strand litter skink =

Conservation status
- Least Concern (IUCN 3.1)

Scientific classification
- Kingdom: Animalia
- Phylum: Chordata
- Class: Reptilia
- Order: Squamata
- Family: Scincidae
- Genus: Caledoniscincus
- Species: C. haplorhinus

Binomial name
- Caledoniscincus haplorhinus (Günther, 1872)
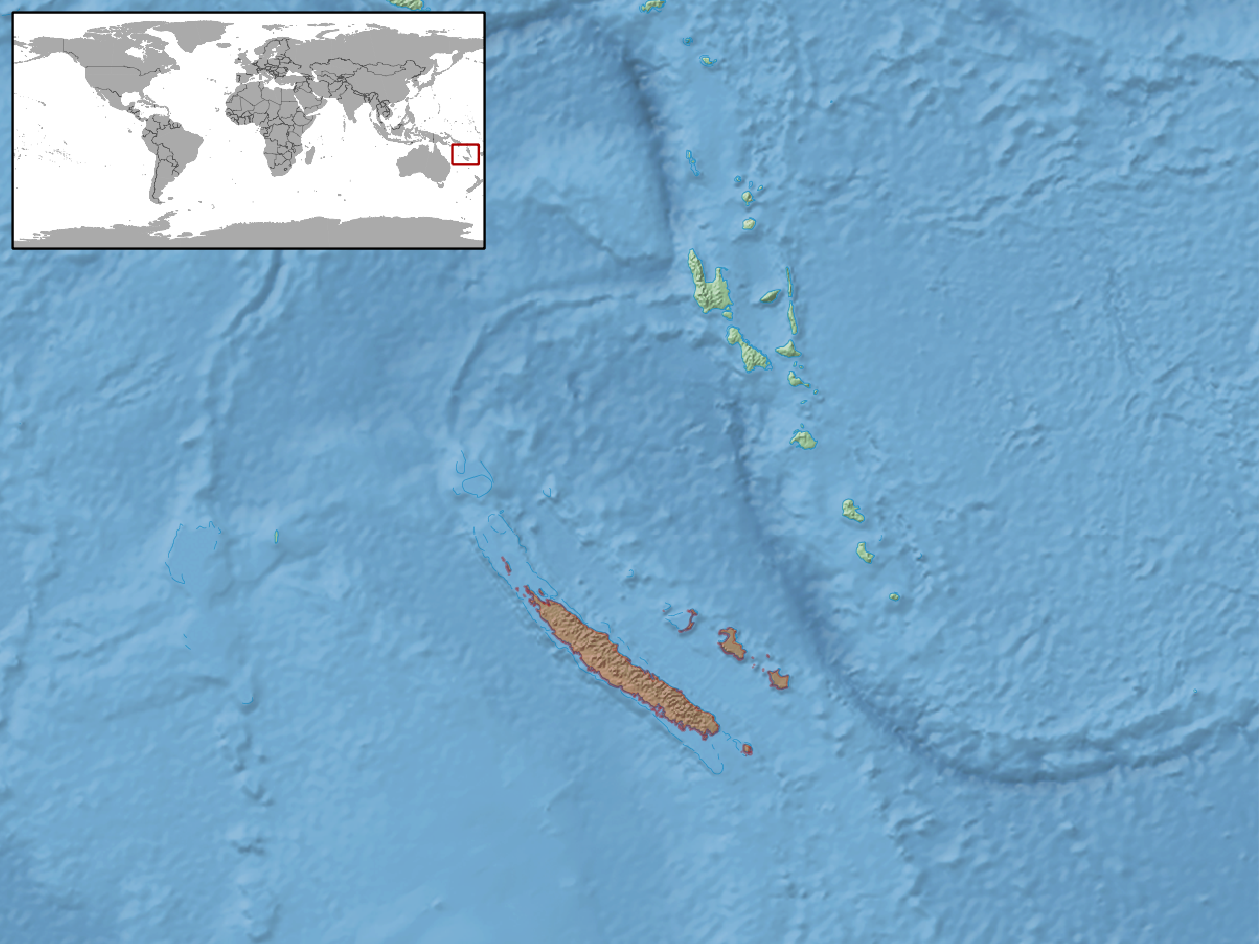

Species of lizard

The Strand litter skink (Caledoniscincus haplorhinus) is a species of lizard in the family Scincidae. It is endemic to New Caledonia.
