= Caledoniscincus chazeaui =

Conservation status
- Endangered (IUCN 3.1)

Scientific classification
- Kingdom: Animalia
- Phylum: Chordata
- Class: Reptilia
- Order: Squamata
- Family: Scincidae
- Genus: Caledoniscincus
- Species: C. chazeaui

Binomial name
- Caledoniscincus chazeaui Sadlier, Bauer & Colgan, 1999
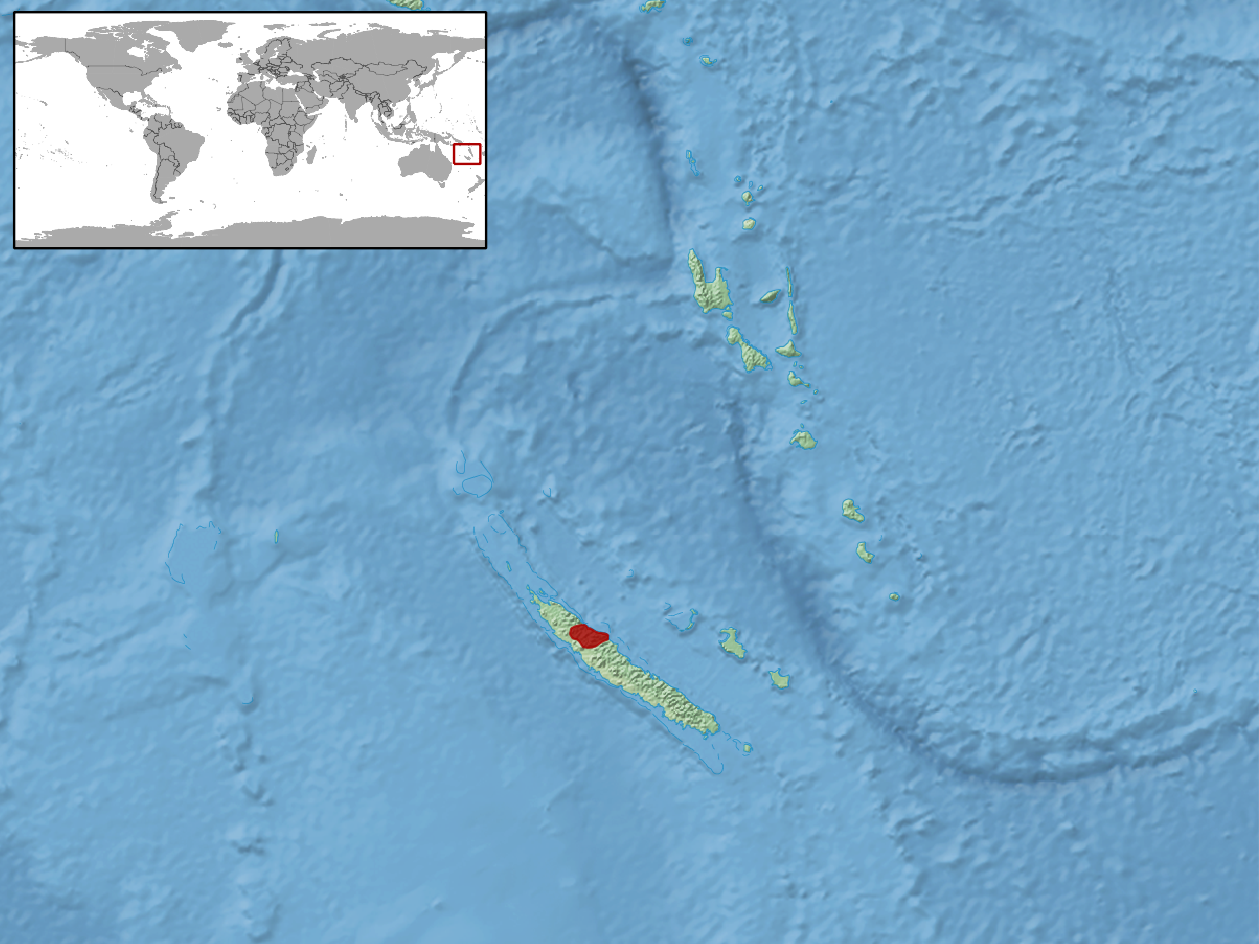

Species of lizard

Caledoniscincus chazeaui, also known as Chazeau's litter skink, is a species of lizard in the family Scincidae. The species is endemic to New Caledonia.

== Etymology ==
The specific name, chazeaui, is in honor of New Caledonian zoologist Jean Chazeau.

== Habitat ==
The preferred natural habitat of C. chazeaui is forest at altitudes up to 900 m (3,000 ft).

== Behavior ==
Caledoniscincus chazeaui is terrestrial and diurnal.

== Reproduction ==
The mode of reproduction of C. chazeaui is unknown.
