= Caledoniscincus auratus =

Conservation status
- Endangered (IUCN 3.1)

Scientific classification
- Kingdom: Animalia
- Phylum: Chordata
- Class: Reptilia
- Order: Squamata
- Family: Scincidae
- Genus: Caledoniscincus
- Species: C. auratus

Binomial name
- Caledoniscincus auratus Sadlier, Bauer, & Colgan, 1999
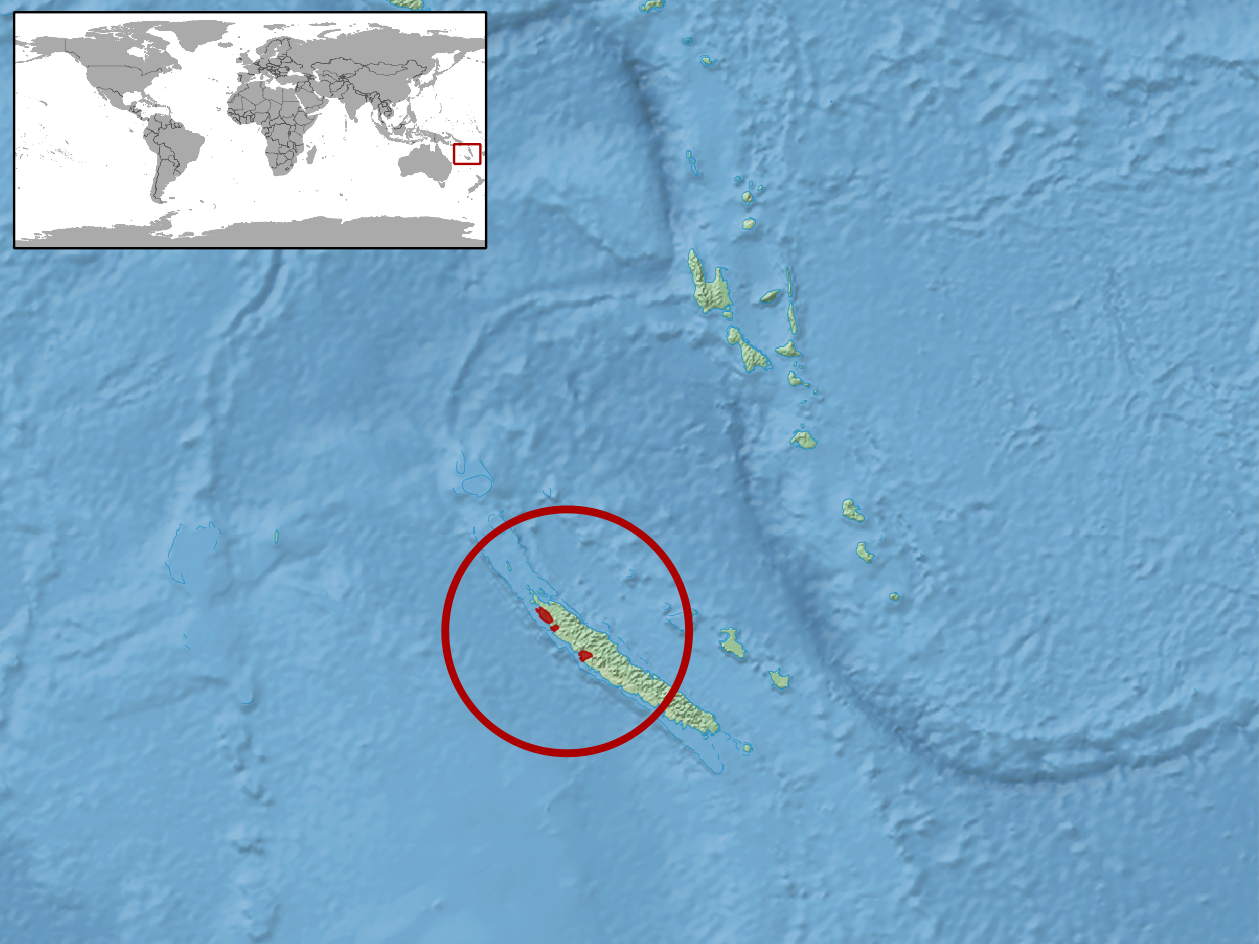

Species of lizard

Caledoniscincus auratus, the Koumac litter skink, is a species of lizard in the family Scincidae. It is endemic to New Caledonia.
