= Kanakysaurus zebratus =

Conservation status
- Endangered (IUCN 3.1)

Scientific classification
- Kingdom: Animalia
- Phylum: Chordata
- Class: Reptilia
- Order: Squamata
- Family: Scincidae
- Genus: Kanakysaurus
- Species: K. zebratus

Binomial name
- Kanakysaurus zebratus Sadlier, Bauer, Smith, & Whitaker, 2008

Species of lizard

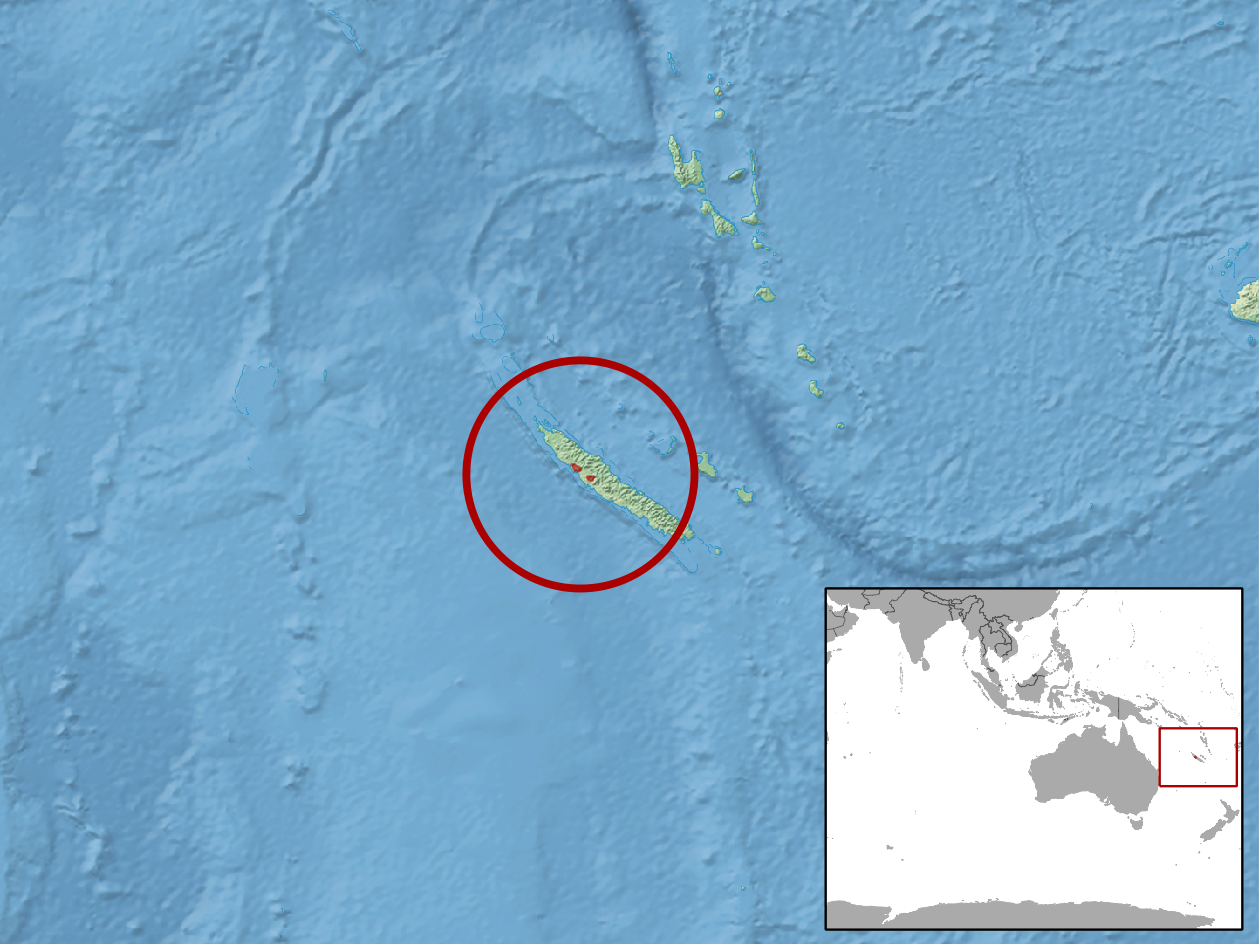
geographic distribution of Kanakysaurus zebratus

Kanakysaurus zebratus is a species of lizard in the family Scincidae. It is found in New Caledonia.
