= Caledoniscincus orestes =

Conservation status
- Vulnerable (IUCN 3.1)

Scientific classification
- Kingdom: Animalia
- Phylum: Chordata
- Class: Reptilia
- Order: Squamata
- Family: Scincidae
- Genus: Caledoniscincus
- Species: C. orestes

Binomial name
- Caledoniscincus orestes Sadlier, 1987
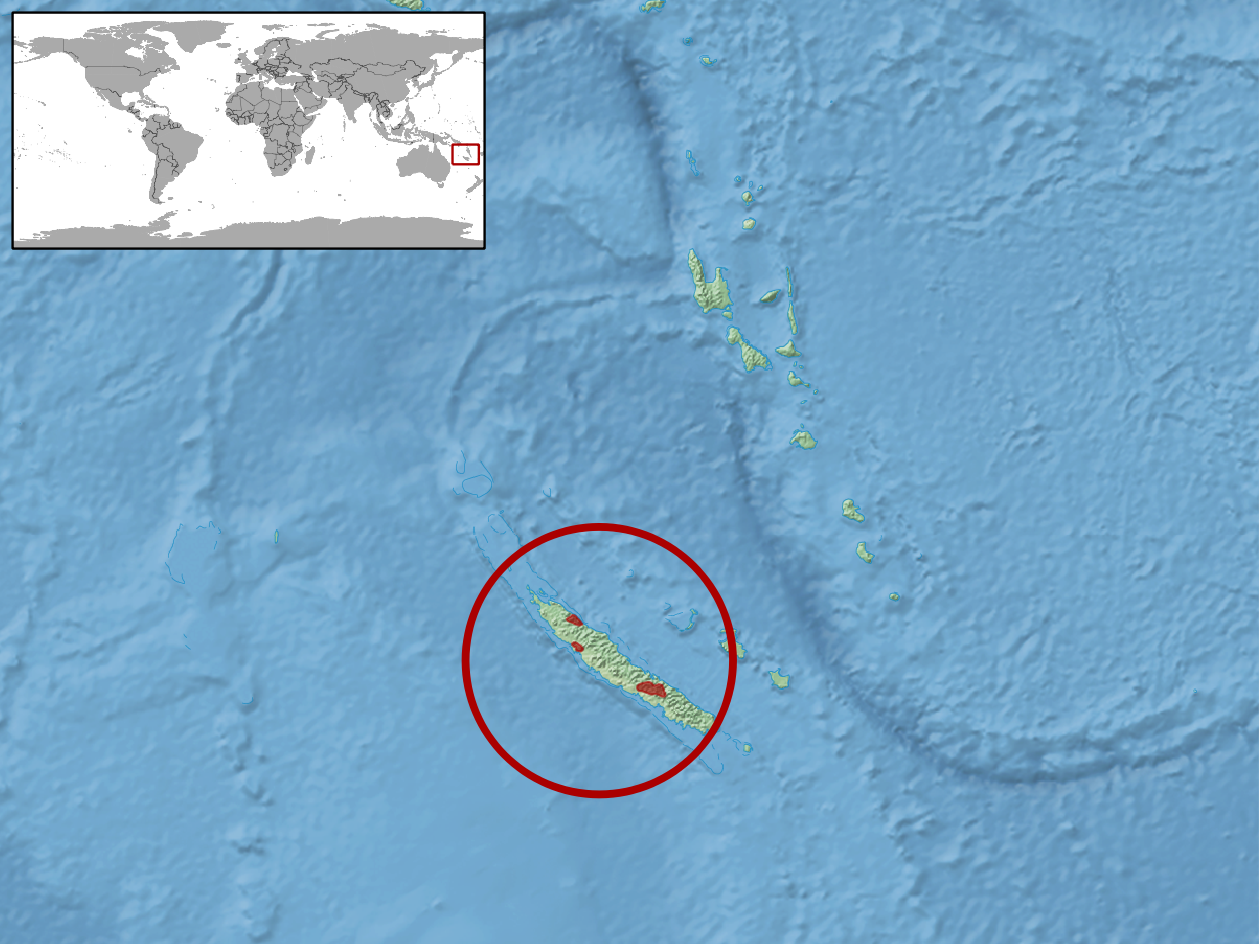

Species of lizard

Caledoniscincus orestes, also known commonly as the Panié litter skink and Sadlier's Caledonian skink, is a species of lizard in the subfamily Eugongylinae of the family Scincidae. The species is endemic to New Caledonia.

== Description ==
Dorsally, Caledoniscincus orestes is brown, with a pale vertebral stripe. The snout has a dark midrostral stripe. The tail is marked with dark chevrons.

== Habitat ==
The preferred natural habitats of Caledoniscincus orestes are forest and shrubland, at elevations of 500–1,600 m (1,600–5,200 ft).

== Behavior ==
Caledoniscincus orestes is terrestrial and diurnal.

== Reproduction ==
Caledoniscincus orestes is oviparous.
