= Caledoniscincus pelletieri =

Conservation status
- Endangered (IUCN 3.1)

Scientific classification
- Kingdom: Animalia
- Phylum: Chordata
- Class: Reptilia
- Order: Squamata
- Family: Scincidae
- Genus: Caledoniscincus
- Species: C. pelletieri

Binomial name
- Caledoniscincus pelletieri Sadlier, Whitaker, Wood, & Bauer, 2014

Species of lizard

Caledoniscincus pelletieri is a species of lizard in the family Scincidae. It is endemic to New Caledonia.
