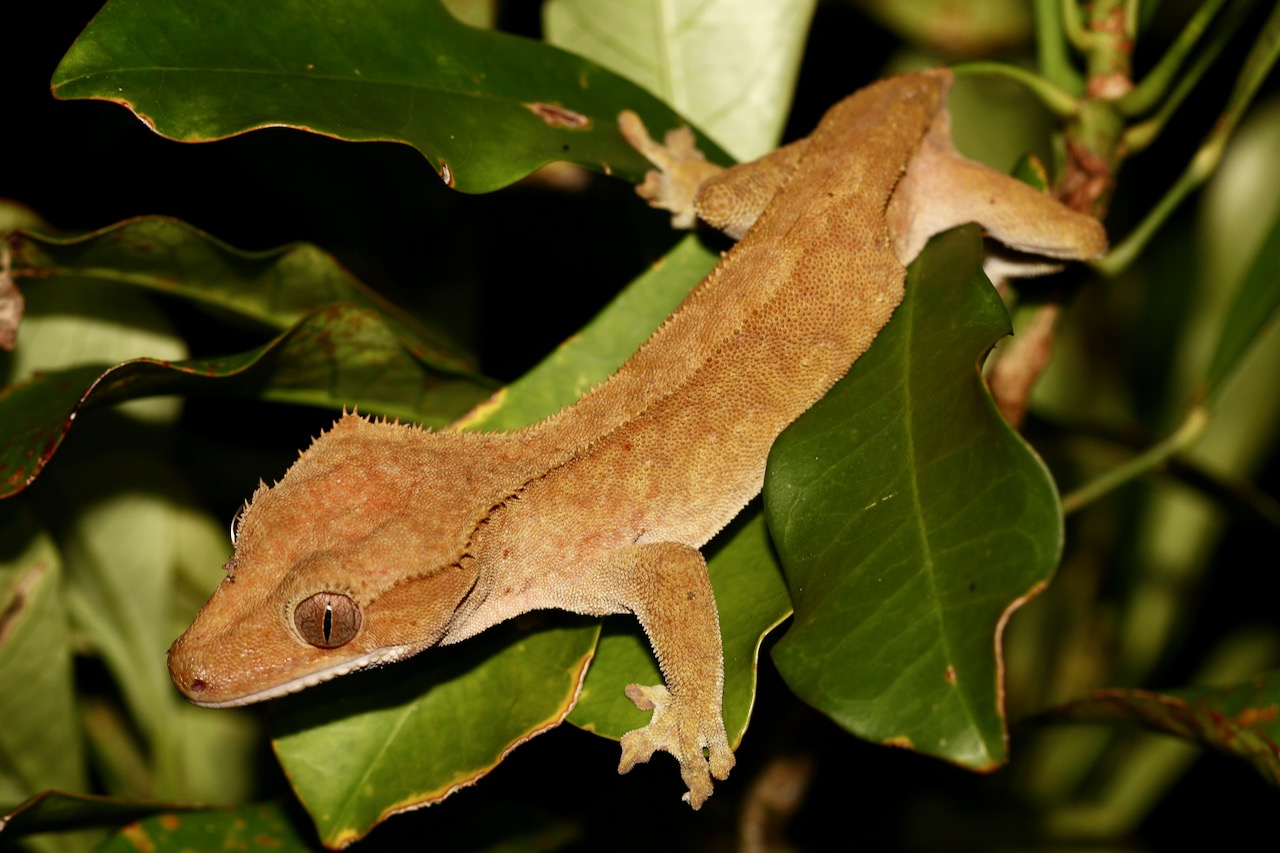

Conservation status
- Vulnerable (IUCN 3.1)

Scientific classification
- Kingdom: Animalia
- Phylum: Chordata
- Class: Reptilia
- Order: Squamata
- Suborder: Gekkota
- Family: Diplodactylidae
- Genus: Correlophus
- Species: C. ciliatus

Binomial name
- Correlophus ciliatus Guichenot, 1866
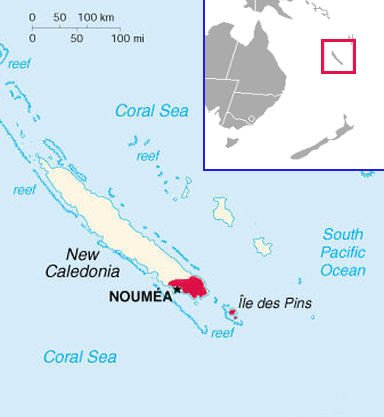
- Approximate distribution of the crested gecko

Synonyms
- Rhacodactylus ciliatus (Guichenot, 1866)

= Crested gecko =

Species of gecko

The crested gecko (Correlophus ciliatus), also known commonly as the eyelash gecko, is a species of lizard in the family Diplodactylidae. The species is native to southern New Caledonia. Originally described in 1866 by French zoologist Alphonse Guichenot, the species was thought to be extinct until it was rediscovered in 1994 during an expedition led by German herpetologist Robert Seipp. Along with several other New Caledonian gecko species, it is being considered for protected status by the Convention on the International Trade in Endangered Species of Wild Flora and Fauna.

== Taxonomy ==
The species was first described in 1866 as Correlophus ciliatus by the Guichenot in an article entitled "Notice sur un nouveau genre de sauriens de la famille des geckotiens du Muséum de Paris [Notice of a new genus of saurians of the gecko family from the Paris Museum]" in the Mémoires de la Société Scientifique Naturelle de Chérbourg. It was later renamed Rhacodactylus ciliatus in 1883. Recent phylogenetic analysis indicates that R. ciliatus and R. sarasinorum are not closely related to each other. So 55 species have been reclassified from the genus Rhacodactylus back to the genus Correlophus.

The specific name, ciliatus, is Latin, from cilia ("fringe" or "eyelashes") and refers to the crest of skin over the animal's eyes that resembles eyelashes.

== Description ==
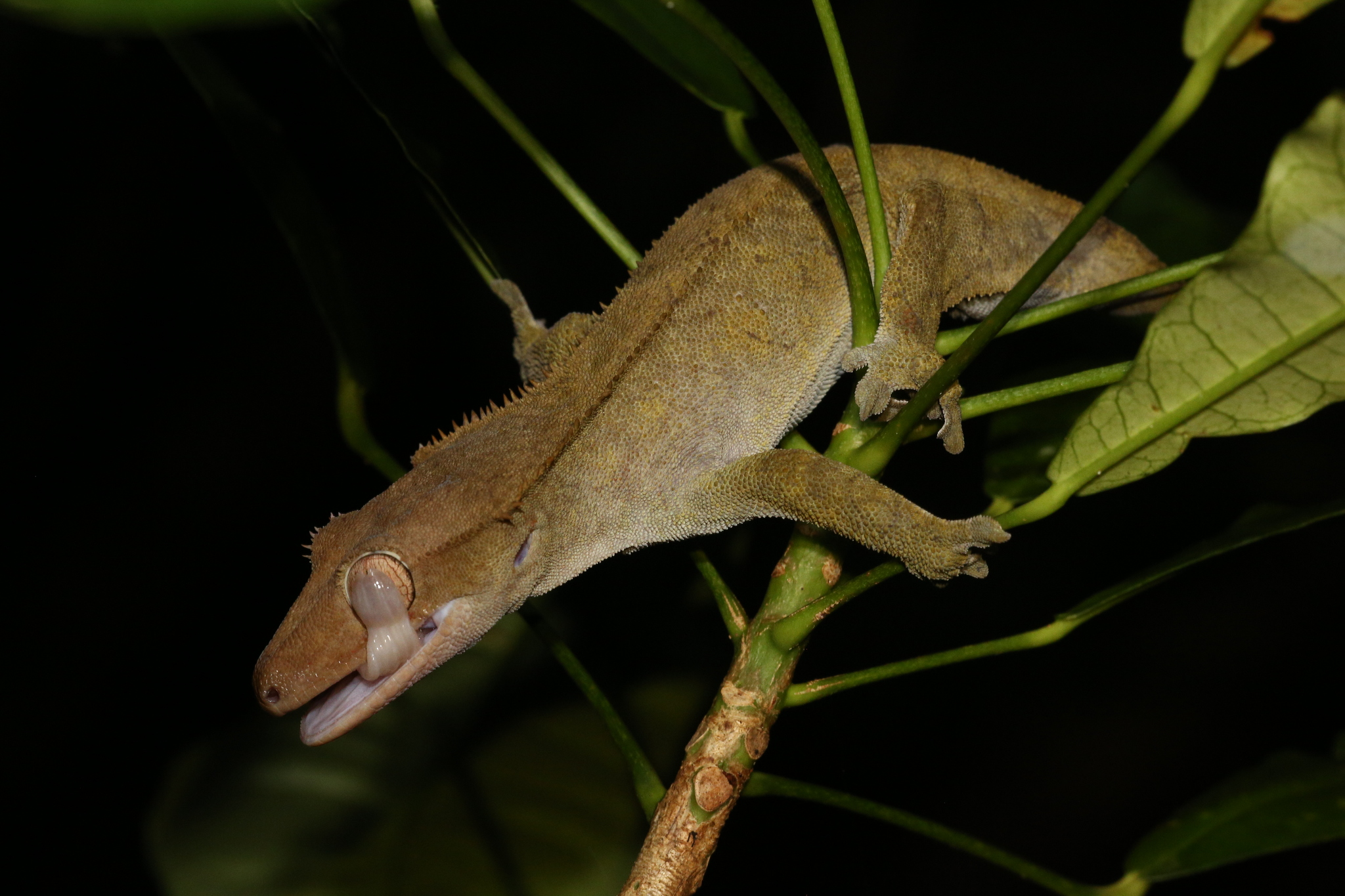
Wild crested gecko displaying eye-cleaning behavior

The crested gecko usually measures 8–10 inches (20–25 cm) in total length, including 4–6 inches (10–15 cm) of tail length. Among the most distinctive features of the crested gecko are the hair-like projections found above the eyes, which resemble eyelashes. These projections continue as two rows of spines that run from the eyes to the sides of the wedge-shaped head and continue to the base of the tail. The crested gecko does not have eyelids. Instead, a transparent scale, or spectacle, keeps each eye moist, and the gecko uses its tongue to clear away debris. The crested gecko possesses Gehyra pupils, which are slit-shaped with lobed edges. They have large cones and apertures, giving a wide but short-sighted view, which aids in nocturnal hunting.

The species possesses a semi-prehensile tail which it uses to assist in climbing. The tail can be dropped (via caudal autotomy) to distract predators, predetermined at specific segments where small fractures in the tail bone lie. The crested gecko does not regenerate its tail once lost. Most adults in the wild lack tails. The capillaries in the tail close almost immediately when dropped, resulting in next to no blood loss. The tail will continue to move for about 2–5 minutes after being dropped.

The toes and the tip of the semi-prehensile tail are covered in small hairs called setae. Each seta is divided into hundreds of smaller (approximately 200 nanometres in diameter) hairs called spatulae. It is believed these structures exploit the weak van der Waals force, to help the gecko climb on most solid surfaces, most easily on flatter, smoother surfaces such as glass or wood. The toes have small claws which aid in climbing surfaces to which its toes cannot cling.

The crested gecko has many naturally occurring color groups, including grey, brown, red, orange, and yellow of various shades. It has three color morphs in the wild: pattern-less, white-fringed, and tiger.

== Distribution ==
The crested gecko is endemic to South Province, New Caledonia. There are three disjunct populations: one on the Isle of Pines and surrounding islets, and two on the main island of Grande Terre. On Grande Terre, one population is around the Blue River protected provincial park, and the other is farther north, just south of Mount Dzumac.

== Ecology ==
=== Habitat and behavior ===
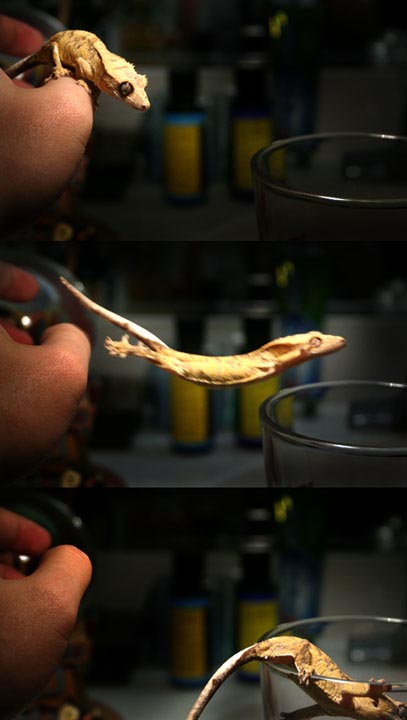
Jumping crested gecko

The crested gecko is a mostly arboreal species, preferring to inhabit the lower canopy and understory of the New Caledonia rainforests.Crested geckos make a high pitched chirping sound to attract mates or scare off predators, and when startled, they may stand up on their hind legs and open their mouths wide to look threatening. It is able to jump long distances between branches to move to new locations. It is nocturnal and will generally spend the daylight hours sleeping in secure spots in high branches.

=== Diet ===
The crested gecko is an omnivore and will opportunistically feed on fruit, nectar, pollen, and a variety of insects.

=== Reproduction ===
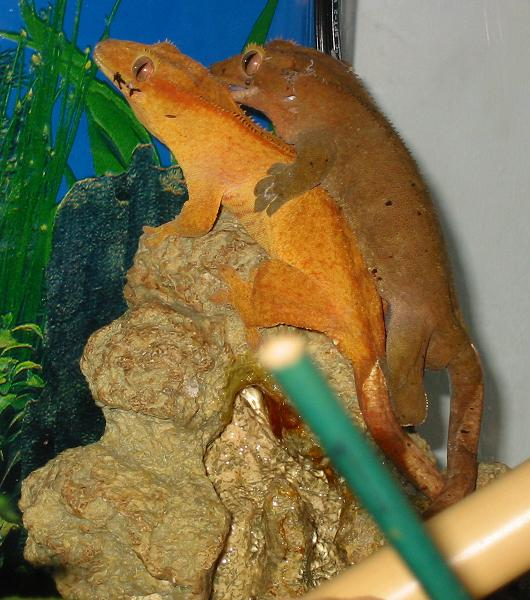
Crested geckos mating

Little is known about the wild reproductive behavior of the crested gecko. Available information has been obtained from captive animals. Females generally lay two eggs per clutch, which hatch 60–150 days after they are laid. In crested geckos, the sex of the hatchlings is not determined by genetics, but by the temperature of the eggs during incubation warmer, temperatures produce more males, while cooler temperatures produce more females. A female crested gecko only has to mate with a male once in order to lay 2 eggs every 4–6 weeks for a breeding cycle of upwards of 8–10 months. After a breeding cycle, females in the wild go through a "cooling" cycle, usually prompted by slight temperature and daylight changes over the winter season. During this time, the females are able to regain the body mass and nutrients they lost during egg-laying.

The crested gecko has two small sacs for calcium on the roof of its mouth. If an egg-laying female does not have enough calcium her sac will be depleted, and she can suffer from calcium deficiency. This can lead to a calcium crash, in which the female appears shaky or wobbly, lethargic, has a lack of appetite, and can even result in death. Calcium supplements exist for the crested gecko in captivity, although it is unknown how specimens in the wild sustain their supply.

Newly hatched crested geckos will generally not eat until after they have shed and eaten their skin for the first time, having relied until then on the remains of their yolk sack for nutrition.

=== Predation ===
Studies show rodents and cats as the primary predation threat to the crested gecko. Pacific rats are thought to have been introduced to New Caledonia some 3000 years ago by Melanesians, with ship rats and brown rats following in the 19th century. Crested gecko remains were present in a 2017 analysis of the digestive tracts of New Caledonia rodents. Since gecko remains become unidentifiable in post-digestion samples, predation threats may be underestimated.

== Conservation ==
The crested gecko was believed to be extinct prior to rediscovery in 1994. The species is currently being assessed for CITES protection and vulnerable status. The biggest single threat to the wild population appears to be the introduction of the little fire ant (Wassmania auropunctata) to New Caledonia. This ant species preys on the crested gecko, stinging and attacking in very large numbers, and it also competes with the crested gecko for food by preying on arthropods. Other threats to the wild population include habitat damage from wildfires, rodent predation, and habitat degradation from introduced rusa deer, pigs, cats, and rats.

== As a pet ==
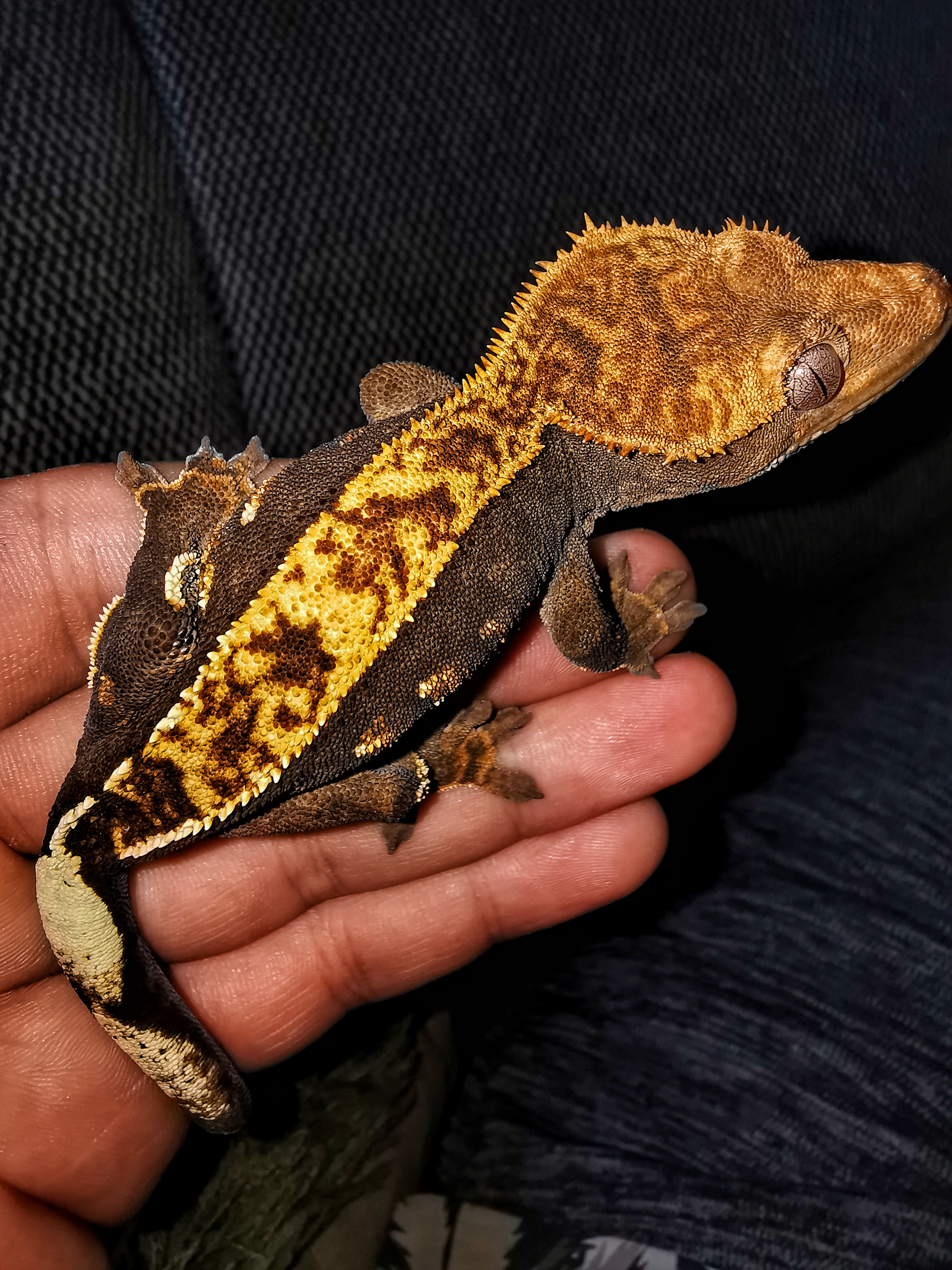
Juvenile female crested gecko

Though the export of wild specimens of the crested gecko is now prohibited, biologists exported several specimens for breeding and study before New Caledonia stopped issuing permits to export the species. From these specimens, different breeding lines were established, both in Europe and the United States. The crested gecko is now one of the most widely-kept and bred species of gecko in the world, second only to the leopard gecko.

The crested gecko can be very long-lived. While it has not been kept in captivity long enough for a definitive life span to be determined, it has been kept for 15–20 years or more.
