= Anthony Whitaker =

New Zealand herpetologist

Anthony Whitaker MNZM
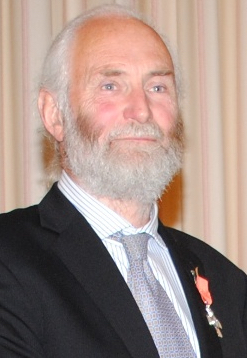
- Whitaker in 2010
- Born: Anthony Hume Whitaker; 5 September 1944; Chesterfield, Derbyshire, England
- Died: 20 February 2014 (aged 69); Orinoco, Tasman District, New Zealand
- Citizenship: New Zealand
- Education: Victoria University of Wellington
- Scientific career
- Fields: Herpetology
- Workplaces: DSIR

Anthony Hume Whitaker MNZM (5 September 1944 – 20 February 2014) was a New Zealand herpetologist, contributing a 50-year career of fieldwork, pioneering research and species discoveries. His is still the largest collection of reptile and amphibian specimens donated to Museum of New Zealand Te Papa Tongarewa.

== Biography ==
Born in Chesterfield, Derbyshire, England, on 5 September 1944, Whitaker emigrated to New Zealand with his family in 1951, and became a naturalised New Zealander in 1976. He grew up in Upper Hutt, attending St. Patrick's College, Silverstream, and later gaining his Bachelor of Science degree majoring in zoology from Victoria University of Wellington in 1966. He married and fathered two children, and lived in Motueka for much of his life. Whitaker died from a heart attack while mountain-biking near Motueka on 20 February 2014.

== Herpetology work ==
Whitaker's passion for reptiles was evident from an early age, collecting early specimens of skink while growing up in Upper Hutt. While on a family holiday in the Marlborough Sounds, the 12-year-old Whitaker had gone out to look for geckos. Upon learning of his interest, a publican in Saint Arnaud gave him a jar of geckos pickled in vodka.

In 1966, he joined the Ecology Division of the DSIR, New Zealand's main scientific research institute at the time, as a lab technician and later research scientist, specialising in reptiles. By the time he left in 1977, the department's collection had grown to over 2000 specimens and was donated to the New Zealand national museum. Whitaker helped found the Society for Research on Amphibians and Reptiles in New Zealand in 1987 and was a long-serving editor of its journal, SRARNZ Notes.

Both Whitaker himself and his distinguished work over many decades were widely respected by New Zealand ecologists and biologists. He produced about 230 published papers and scientific and conservation reports, mentored many in the field, and was appointed a Member of the New Zealand Order of Merit in the 2010 Queen's Birthday Honours, for services to herpetology. He remarked at the time that one of his greatest achievements had been to recognise early on the predatory threat that rats pose to native reptile species, confirmed by later research and pest eradication programmes.

Whitaker has one species of skink named after him, Oligosoma whitakeri (Whitaker's skink), and by himself he named one species Mokopirirakau kahutarae, Whitaker's sticky-toed gecko or the black-eyed gecko. As co-author, he has participated in describing and naming approximately two dozen other new species of reptiles: Bavayia exsuccida, Bavayia goroensis, Bavayia pulchella, Caledoniscincus constellatus, Caledoniscincus pelletieri, Correlophus belepensis, Dierogekko baaba, Dierogekko inexpectatus, Dierogekko insularis, Dierogekko kaalaensis, Dierogekko koniambo, Dierogekko nehoueensis, Dierogekko poumensis, Dierogekko thomaswhitei, Eurydactylodes occidentalis, Kanakysaurus viviparus, Kanakysaurus zebratus, Lioscincus vivae, Marmorosphax boulinda, Marmorosphax kaala, Marmorosphax taom, Mniarogekko jalu, Nannoscincus koniambo, Nannoscincus manautei, Oligosoma hoparatea, Phaeoscincus taomensis, Phasmasaurus maruia, and Sigaloseps pisinnus. In addition, his specimen collection has provided holotypes for several other species, including the skinks Oligosoma chloronoton, Oligosoma stenotis, Oligosoma longipes, and Oligosoma townsi.

== Published works ==
=== Non-fiction books ===
- Gill, B.; Whitaker, A. (1996). New Zealand Frogs & Reptiles. Auckland: D. Bateman. ISBN 978-1-86953-264-2.
