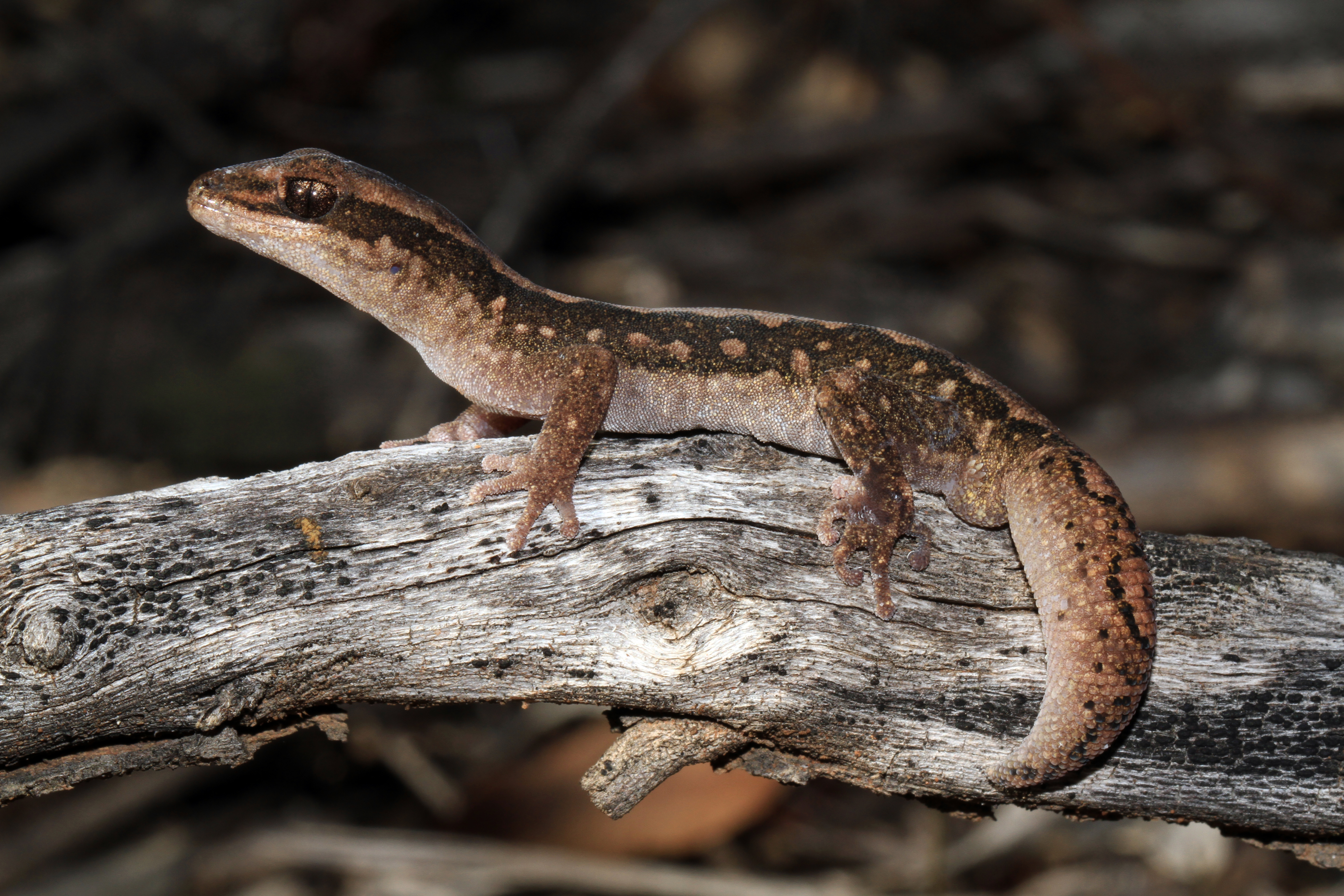
- Eastern stone gecko (Diplodactylus vittatus)
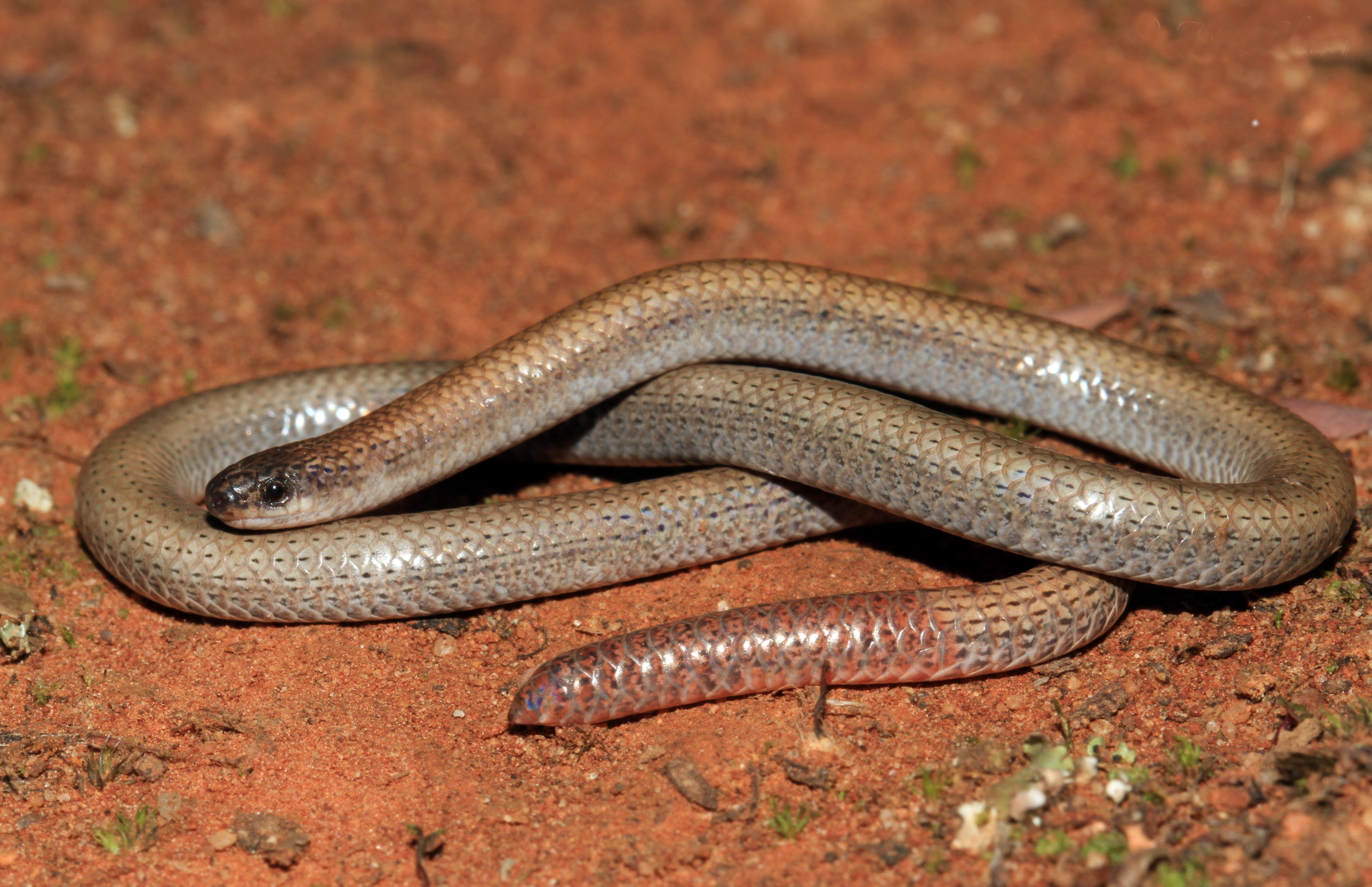
- Pink-tailed worm-lizard (Aprasia parapulchella)

Scientific classification
- Kingdom: Animalia
- Phylum: Chordata
- Class: Reptilia
- Order: Squamata
- Suborder: Gekkota
- Infraorder: Pygopodomorpha; Vidal & Hedges, 2009
- Superfamily: Pygopodoidea; Gray, 1845

Families
- Diplodactylidae; Carphodactylidae; Pygopodidae

= Pygopodoidea =

Pygopodoidea Temporal range: Albian – Present, 110–0 Ma

Superfamily of lizards

Pygopodoidea is a gecko superfamily and the only taxon in the gekkotan subclade Pygopodomorpha. The clade includes three Australasian families: Diplodactylidae (stone geckos), Carphodactylidae (knob-tailed geckos), and Pygopodidae (flap-footed geckos). Traditional gekkotan systematics had considered Diplodactylidae and Carphodactylidae as subfamilies of the family Gekkonidae, but recent molecular work have placed Pygopodidae within Gekkonidae making it paraphyletic. These analyses have shown support of Pygopodidae and Carphodactylidae being sister taxa, with Diplodactylidae occupying a basal position in Pygopodoidea.

Below is a taxonomic list of pygopodoid genera in taxonomic order:

- Pygopodomorpha (Vidal & Hedges, 2009)
  - Pygopodoidea (Gray, 1845)
    - Diplodactylidae (Underwood, 1954) – Stone Geckos
      - Crenadactylus (Dixon & Kluge, 1964) – Clawless Gecko
      - Nebulifera (Oliver, Bauer, Greenbaum, Jackman & Hobbie, 2012) – Robust Velvet Gecko
      - Amalosia (Wells & Wellington, 1984) – Amalosian Velvet Geckos
      - Oedura (J. E. Gray, 1842) – Oeduran Velvet Geckos
      - Hesperoedura (Oliver, Bauer, Greenbaum, Jackman & Hobbie, 2012) – Reticulated Velvet Gecko
      - Strophurus (Fitzinger, 1843) – Spiny-tailed Geckos
      - Diplodactylus (Gray, 1832) – Stone Geckos
      - Rhynchoedura (Günther, 1867) – Beaked Geckos
      - Lucasium (Wermuth, 1965) – Ground Geckos
      - Toropuku (Nielsen, Bauer, Jackman, Hitchmough & Daugherty, 2011) – New Zealand Striped Gecko
      - Naultinus (Gray, 1842) – New Zealand Green Geckos
      - Tukutuku (Nielsen, Bauer, Jackman, Hitchmough & Daugherty, 2011) – Harlequin Gecko
      - Dactylocnemis (Steindachner, 1867) – Pacific Geckos
      - Mokopirirakau (Nielsen, Bauer, Jackman, Hitchmough & Daugherty, 2011) – Forest Geckos
      - Woodworthia (Garman, 1901) – Woodworth's Geckos
      - Hoplodactylus (Fitzinger, 1843) – Hoplodactyl Geckos
      - Pseudothecadactylus (Brongersma, 1936) – Cave Geckos
      - Bavayia (Roux, 1913) – Bavay's Geckos
      - Paniegekko (Bauer, Jackman, Sadlier & Whitaker, 2012) – Panié du Massif Gecko
      - Dierogekko (Bauer, Jackman, Sadlier & Whitaker, 2006) – New Caledonian Striped Geckos
      - Oedodera (Bauer, Jackman, Sadlier & Whitaker, 2006) – Marbled Gecko
      - Correlophus (Guichenot, 1866) – Correloph Geckos
      - Rhacodactylus (Fitzinger, 1843) – Rhacodactyl Geckos
      - Mniarogekko (Bauer, Whitaker, Sadlier & Jackman, 2012) – Mossy Geckos
      - Eurydactylodes (Wermuth, 1965) – New Caledonian Chameleon Geckos
    - Carphodactylidae (Kluge, 1967) – Knob-tailed Geckos
      - Phyllurus (Schinz, 1822) – Phyllur Leaf-tailed Geckos
      - Saltuarius (Couper, Covacevich & Moritz, 1993) – Saltuar Leaf-tailed Geckos
      - Orraya (Couper, Covacevich, Schneider & Hoskin, 2000) – McIlwraith Leaf-tailed Gecko
      - Carphodactylus (Günther, 1897) – Australian Chameleon Gecko
      - Uvidicolus (Oliver & Bauer, 2011) – Border Thick-tailed Gecko
      - Underwoodisaurus (Wermuth, 1965) – Underwood's Geckos
      - Nephrurus (Günther, 1876) – Knob-tailed Geckos
    - Pygopodidae (Gray, 1845) – Flap-footed Geckos
      - Delma (Gray, 1831) – Delmas
      - Lialis (Gray, 1835) – Lialis
      - Ophidiocephalus (Lucas & Frost, 1897) – Bronzeback Snake-lizard
      - Pletholax (Cope, 1864) – Slender Slider
      - Aprasia (Gray, 1839) – Worm Geckos
      - Paradelma (Kinghorn, 1926) – Brigalow Scalyfoot
      - Pygopus (Merrem, 1820) – Scalyfeet
