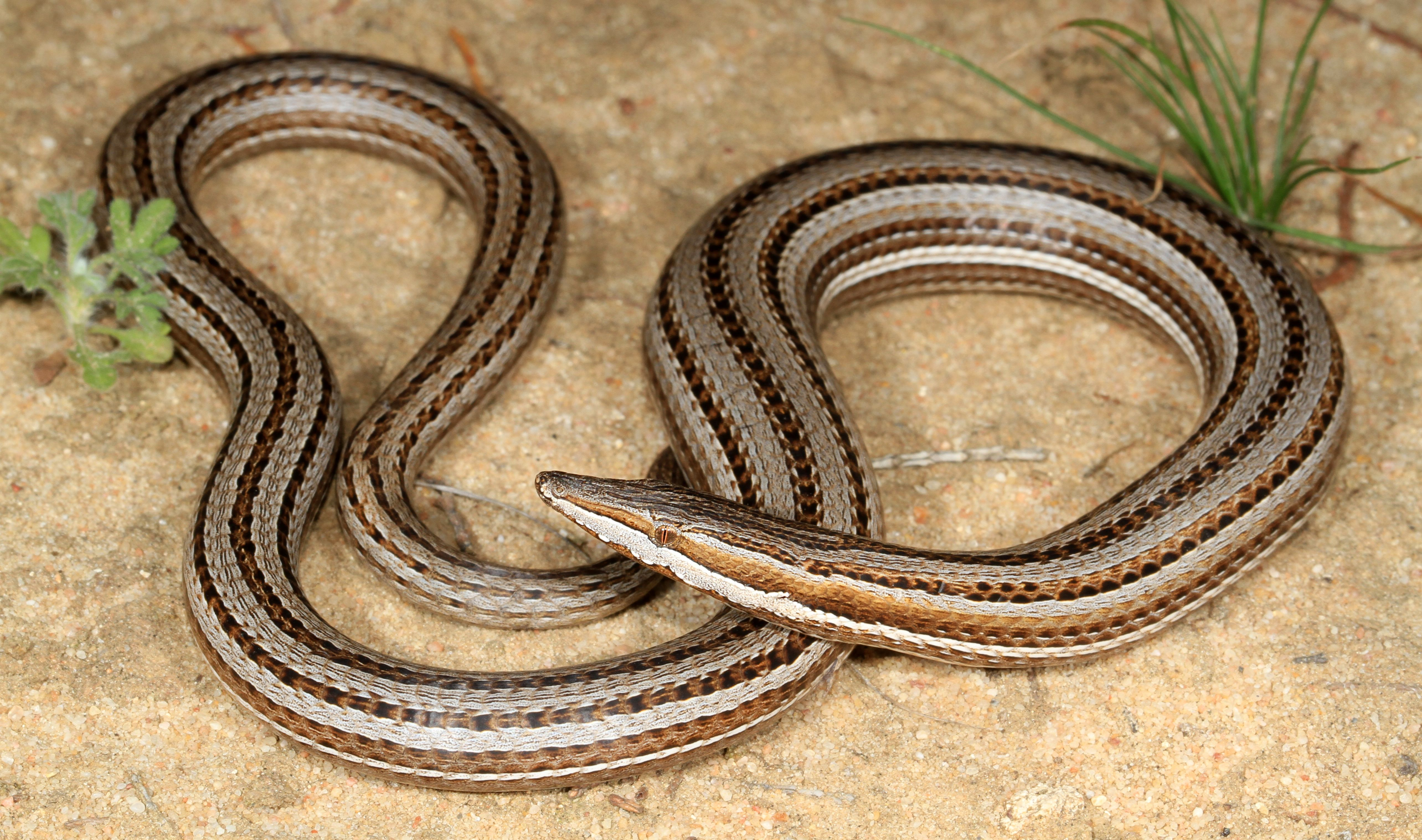

Conservation status
- Least Concern (IUCN 3.1)

Scientific classification
- Kingdom: Animalia
- Phylum: Chordata
- Class: Reptilia
- Order: Squamata
- Suborder: Gekkota
- Family: Pygopodidae
- Genus: Lialis
- Species: L. burtonis

Binomial name
- Lialis burtonis Gray, 1835

= Burton's legless lizard =

Species of lizard

Burton's legless lizard (Lialis burtonis) is a species of lizard in the family Pygopodidae. The species lacks forelegs and has only rudimentary hind legs. Pygopodid lizards are also referred to as "legless lizards", "flap-footed lizards" and "snake-lizards". This species is native to Australia and Papua New Guinea.

== Taxonomy ==
English zoologist John Edward Gray described Burton's legless lizard in 1835. The specific name, burtonis, is in honour of British army surgeon Edward Burton (1790–1867). Burton's legless lizard (Lialis burtonis) is a member of the genus Lialis within the family Pygopodidae. There are approximately 40 species in the family Pygopodidae, however, Burton's legless lizard and another species (L. jicari) are the only species that fall within genus Lialis. Members in genus Lialis are considered analogous to macrostomatan snakes as these taxonomic groups have functionally similar adaptations such as the ability to swallow relatively large prey whole. However, their resemblance to snakes is merely superficial example of convergent evolution, and they are not closely related.

Differences between legless lizards and snakes include the lack of venom glands in legless lizards, their inability to constrict prey, the presence of a fleshy tongue rather than a forked tongue, visible ear holes, and remnant hind limbs. Burton's legless lizard and the Pygopodidae, as a whole, are members of the infraorder Gekkota, meaning that they are essentially legless geckos. Pygopods are the namesake of the Australasian gecko superfamily Pygopodoidea (sometimes called Diplodactyloidea), and they are the sister taxon to legged geckos in the family Carphodactylidae.

== Description ==
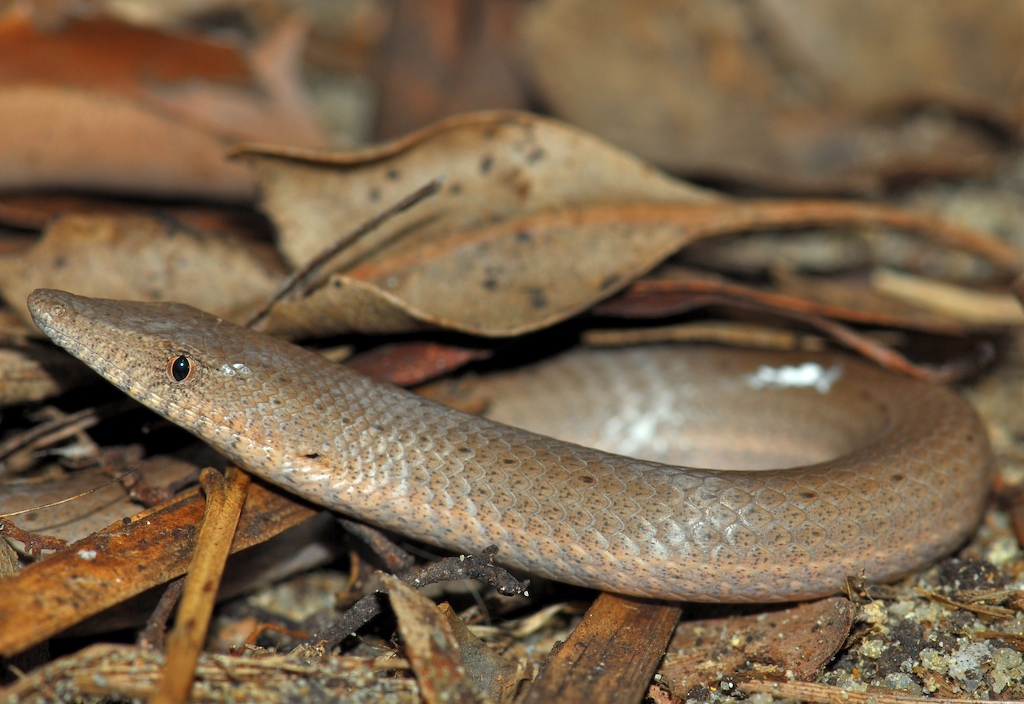
Burton's legless lizard and its elongated snout and distinctive wedge-shaped head

Burton's legless lizard has significant morphological adaptations to enable it to deal with large struggling prey items. The first adaptation is a skull with an elongated snout that may, along with its pointed, recurved and hinged teeth, be an adaptation that assists it to grip its prey. In addition, this elongated snout may also promote binocular vision which would allow strikes to be more accurately directed. Another adaptation that assists Burton's legless lizard to hold its prey is its flexible mesokinetic and hypokinetic joints which allow its jaws to encircle prey. Lastly, the ability of the species to retract its eyes is of key importance as it is a visual predator that relies on eyesight and this adaptation effectively protects them during conflict.

== Distribution and habitat ==
Burton's legless lizard occurs almost Australia wide but it is absent in parts of southern Australia including Tasmania. This species is also found in Papua New Guinea, although populations are limited to one small area.

Burton's legless lizard is found in a variety of habitats from deserts to the margins of rainforests but not in southern alpine areas and extreme northern deserts as would be expected based on its distribution. It is usually found in low vegetation or debris on the ground such as leaf litter which has been shown to be important to specimens located in tropical environments. This was demonstrated in an experiment where individuals were given a choice of several thermally comparable environments and there was an overwhelming preference for leaf litter by specimens from the tropics. In areas where leaf litter is not as readily available this species will use grasses, abandoned burrows and other shelter that it can find as habitat.

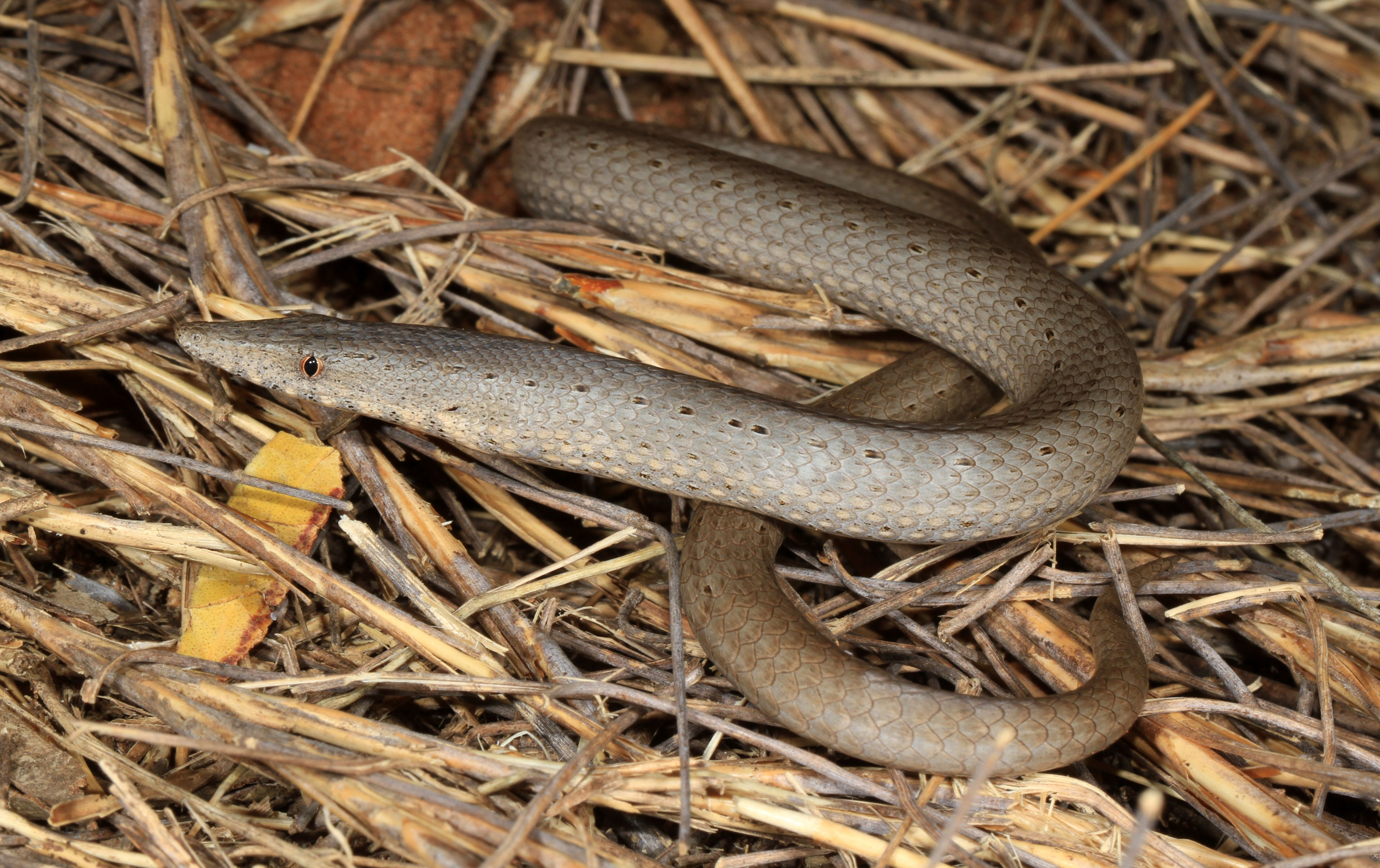
Burton's legless lizard on some sticks

== Diet ==
L. burtonis feeds almost exclusively on lizards. Generally, skinks are the main prey item taken but other legless lizards and geckos are also a part of the diet of Burton's legless lizard. In addition, it has been reported that this species will eat small snakes on rare occasions and this has been documented in a study of the stomach contents of museum specimens. Notably, this species also feeds rather infrequently according to a recent study.

== Reproduction ==
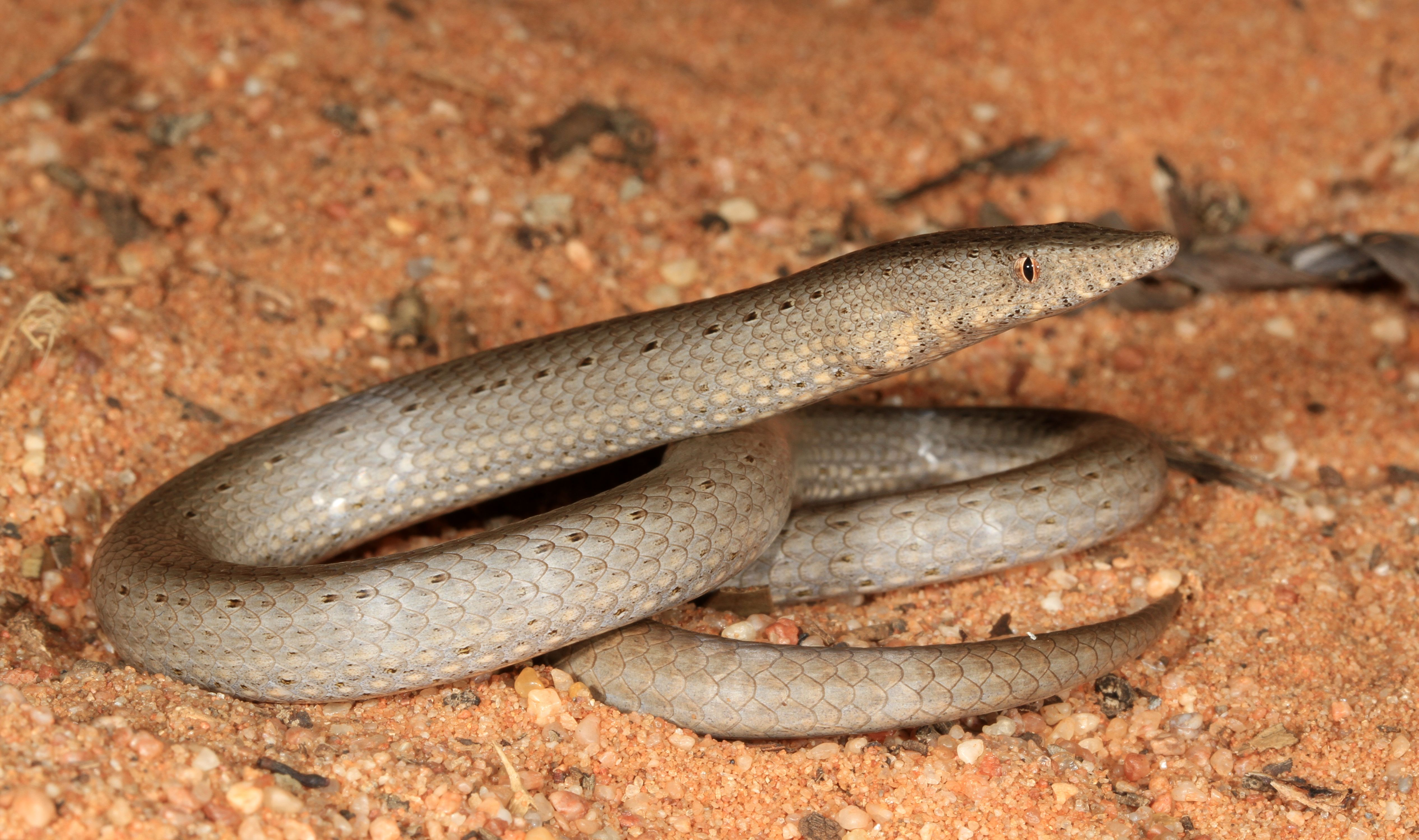
Burton's legless lizard on sand

Reproduction seems to be seasonal in populations of Burton's legless lizard and mating occurs at similar times throughout Australia. Ovulation and mating for the species usually occurs from September until summer. The species is oviparous and eggs are generally laid from November to January, although, reproduction can occur at any time outside of the usual breeding season and females are capable of laying more than one clutch each year. Eggs are laid under logs or rocks, on the ground, under leaf litter and sometimes in the nests of sugar ants.

Clutches can be laid in quick succession with each clutch containing 1 to 3 tough, leathery eggs, although a clutch size of 2 eggs is by far the most common. Nesting can be communal and up to 20 eggs have been found in a nest. Another characteristic that has been discovered is the ability of females of this species to either store sperm for reproduction at a later time or to reproduce through parthenogenesis which does not require mating to be successful. Hatchlings are approximately 13 centimetres long.

== Captivity ==
In Australia a license is required to keep the Burton's legless lizard as a pet.

== Behaviour ==
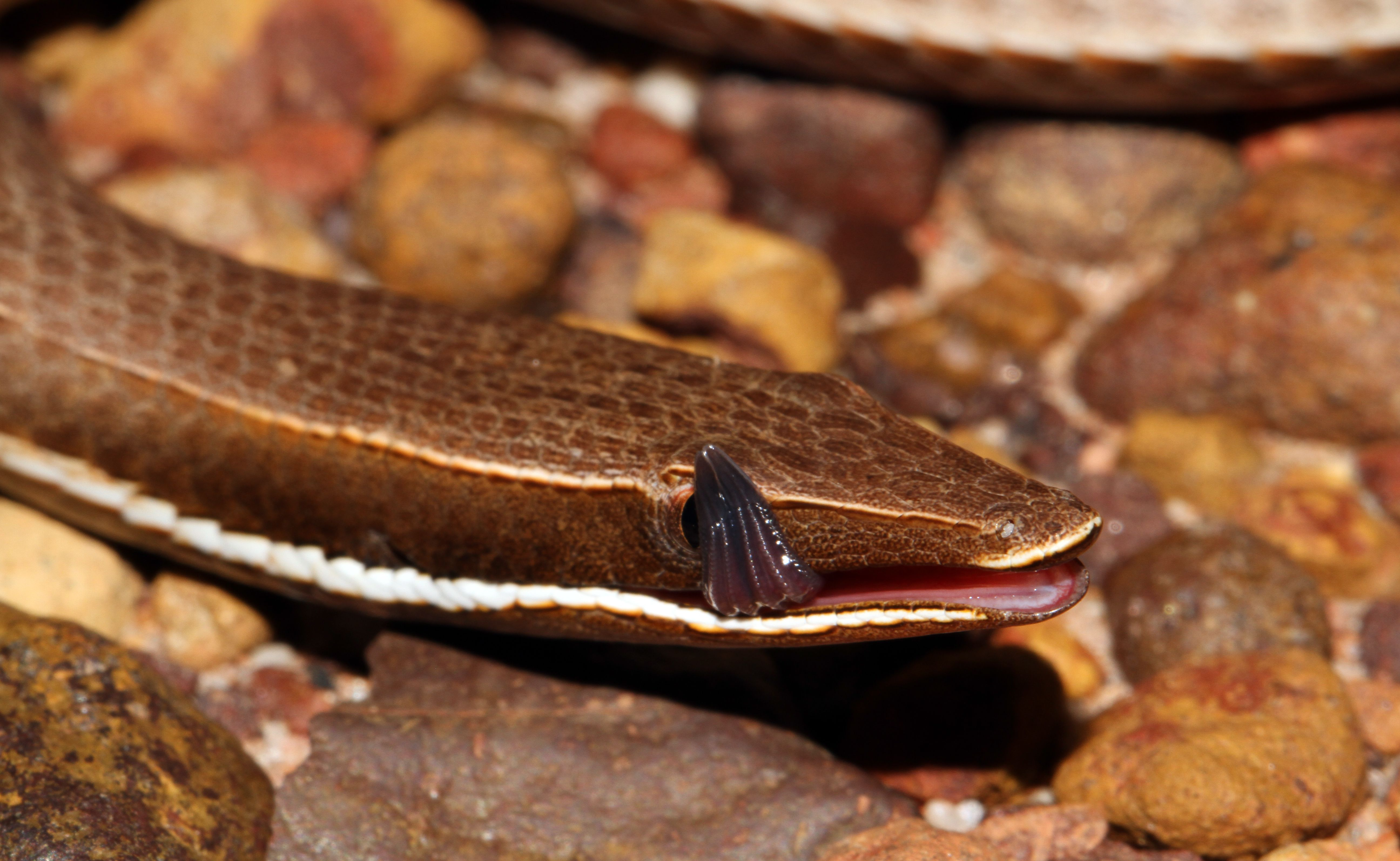
Burton's legless lizard cleaning its spectacle

Burton's legless lizard is generally a diurnal feeder as prey is most commonly encountered during the day but it can be active at any time. This is highlighted as its movements tend to be nocturnal to take advantage of benefits such as reduced risks of hyperthermia during hot conditions and reduced risks of predation from diurnal predators like raptors. Another reason for it to move at night is to avoid revealing its ambush position in the day when it has the highest likelihood of encountering an otherwise unsuspecting prey item. In addition, there is geographic variation in movement and feeding patterns which is expected as this species is very widespread and inhabits a variety of different environments.

This lizard is a visually oriented predator that strikes based on movement and requires shelter to ambush its prey. Shelter is also required to hide from predators and may be particularly important after feeding as individuals become more sedentary than usual which is thought to be an anti-predator response. Alternatively, shelter also plays a key role in lizard thermoregulation. Deep leaf litter for example, is very good shelter as individuals can bury themselves at an appropriate depth to regulate temperature and remain hidden at the same time.

Burton's legless lizard also uses caudal luring as a feeding strategy which is rare in lizards. Notably, this behaviour only occurs if its initial ambush attack is unsuccessful in capturing its intended prey. However, this tactic is not exhibited every time that prey escapes as the likelihood of this tactic being used increases with time since an individual's last meal. Caudal luring can be used to recapture prey in 3 ways as it can be used to lure prey towards it, to distract prey at the moment that it strikes or both.

Feeding strategies are a very important behaviour for this species as the lizards it eats can often be large enough to inflict a retaliatory bite that could cause serious harm. This is thought to be the reason that this species will modify its strike precision according to prey size as strikes at large prey will be directed at either the head or neck to prevent them from biting back. Furthermore, Burton's legless lizard will hold large prey until it is incapacitated before swallowing to prevent harm to itself whereas it swallows small prey that is still struggling as swallowing live prey costs less energy than waiting for it to be incapacitated.

This species also has a tendency to vocalise, especially, when it is threatened. Furthermore, if it is seized by a predator it can drop its tail like many other lizards. However, there are substantial costs associated with a lizard losing its tail as it requires time and energy to grow back.

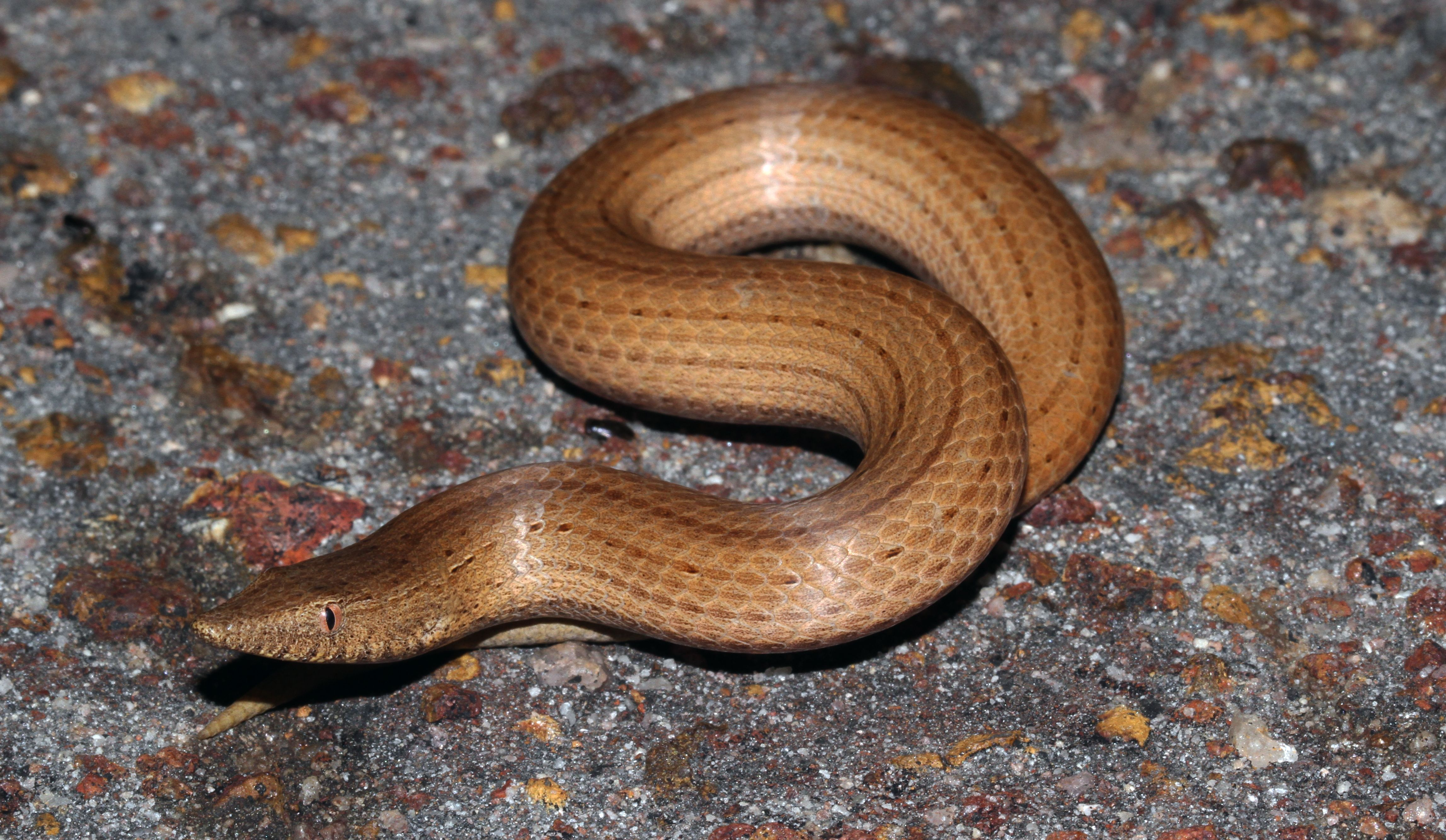
Burton's legless lizard on a rocky surface

== Conservation ==
L. burtonis is not a priority for conservation as it is Australia's most widespread reptile and inhabits almost all Australian habitat types with only a few exceptions. In addition, it is not known how abundant Burton's legless lizard is, but there has been no indication that this species is rare or rapidly declining.
