= S. occultus =

S. occultus may refer to:

- Saltuarius occultus, a species of lizard
- Scapanus occultus, a species of mammal
- Selenops occultus, a species of spider in the genus Selenops
- Stagnicola occultus, a species of gastropod
