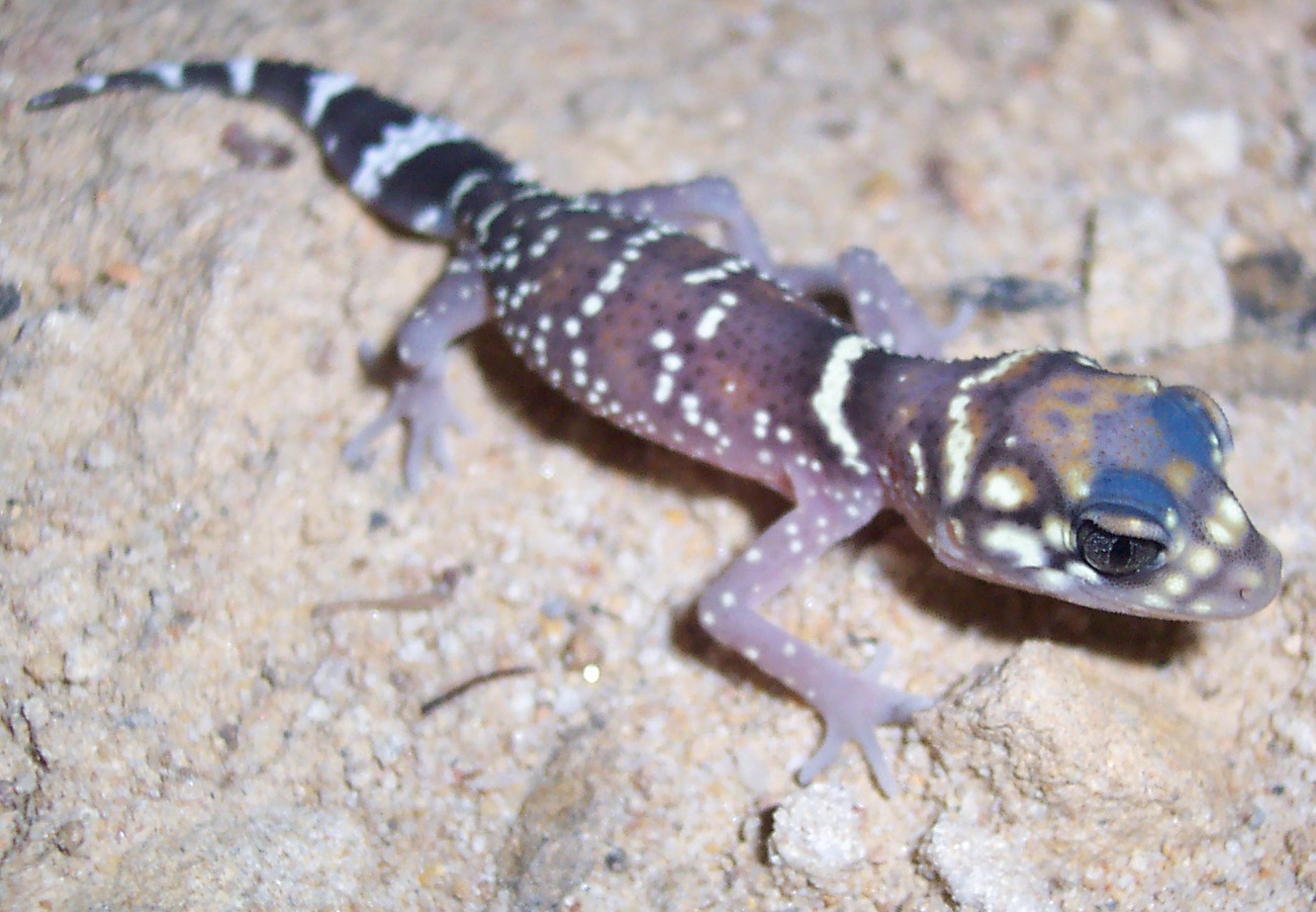

Conservation status
- Least Concern (IUCN 3.1)

Scientific classification
- Kingdom: Animalia
- Phylum: Chordata
- Class: Reptilia
- Order: Squamata
- Suborder: Gekkota
- Family: Carphodactylidae
- Genus: Underwoodisaurus
- Species: U. milii

Binomial name
- Underwoodisaurus milii (Bory de Saint-Vincent, 1823)

Synonyms
- Phyllurus milii Bory de Saint-Vincent, 1823; Cyrtodactylus Nilii [sic] Gray, 1831 (ex errore); Gymnodactylus milii — Loveridge, 1934; Underwoodisaurus milii — Bustard, 1970; Nephrurus milii — Bauer, 1990; Underwoodisaurus milii — Cogger, 2014

= Underwoodisaurus milii =

Species of lizard

Underwoodisaurus milii is a species of gecko, a lizard in the family Carphodactylidae. The species is commonly known as the thick-tailed or barking gecko, referring to its distinctive plump tail and sharp, barking defensive call. The genus is also often called thick-tailed geckos as a group, along with the species Uvidicolus sphyrurus.

== Etymology ==
The specific name, milii, is in honor of French sailor and naturalist Pierre Bernard Milius.

== Description ==
Underwoodisaurus milii is reddish-brown with bands of white and yellow spots, and a paler underbelly. It usually grows to a total length (tail included) of 120–140 mm (4.7–5.5 in). The original tail is black with several pale bands; however, the regenerated tail has little pattern.

== Geographic distribution and habitat ==
Underwoodisaurus milii is found in southern regions of Australia. Its distribution in Western Australia is throughout the southwest, the goldfields, wheatbelt, and Nullarbor regions to the east, and to Shark Bay in the north. It is also found at the Houtman Abrolhos and the Archipelago of the Recherche. U. milii is found in rocky outcrops and is slightly more cold-tolerant than many other Australian gecko species. It is nocturnal, and shelters underneath rocks or in burrows during the day.

== Diet ==
Underwoodisaurus milii preys on arthropods and smaller geckos.

== Behaviour ==
Unusually for reptiles, Underwoodisaurus milii forms aggregations in its retreat sites during the day. The reasons for this are unknown. However, it has been shown that this behavior results in a higher aggregate thermal inertia (they stay warmer) than would be found in solitary geckos of this and related kinds in similar circumstances. In the same source, it was suggested that aggregating for physiological benefits may precede the development of other kinds of social behavior.

When threatened, U. milii will arch its back and "bark". It also does this in breeding season. This species, and some other species of geckos have the unusual habit of licking their eyes after eating, presumably to keep the eyeshield clean.

== Conservation status ==
The species Underwoodisaurus milii has been assessed by the IUCN Red List and is listed as Least Concern. It has not been assessed by the Australian EPBC Act and may be kept as a pet with the appropriate license in at least some states of Australia.
