= Underwoodisaurus seorsus =

Scientific classification
- Kingdom: Animalia
- Phylum: Chordata
- Class: Reptilia
- Order: Squamata
- Suborder: Gekkota
- Family: Carphodactylidae
- Genus: Underwoodisaurus
- Species: U. seorsus

Binomial name
- Underwoodisaurus seorsus Doughty & P. Oliver, 2011

Species of lizard

Underwoodisaurus seorsus is a species of lizard in the family Gekkonidae. It is endemic to the Packsaddle Range in western Australia.
