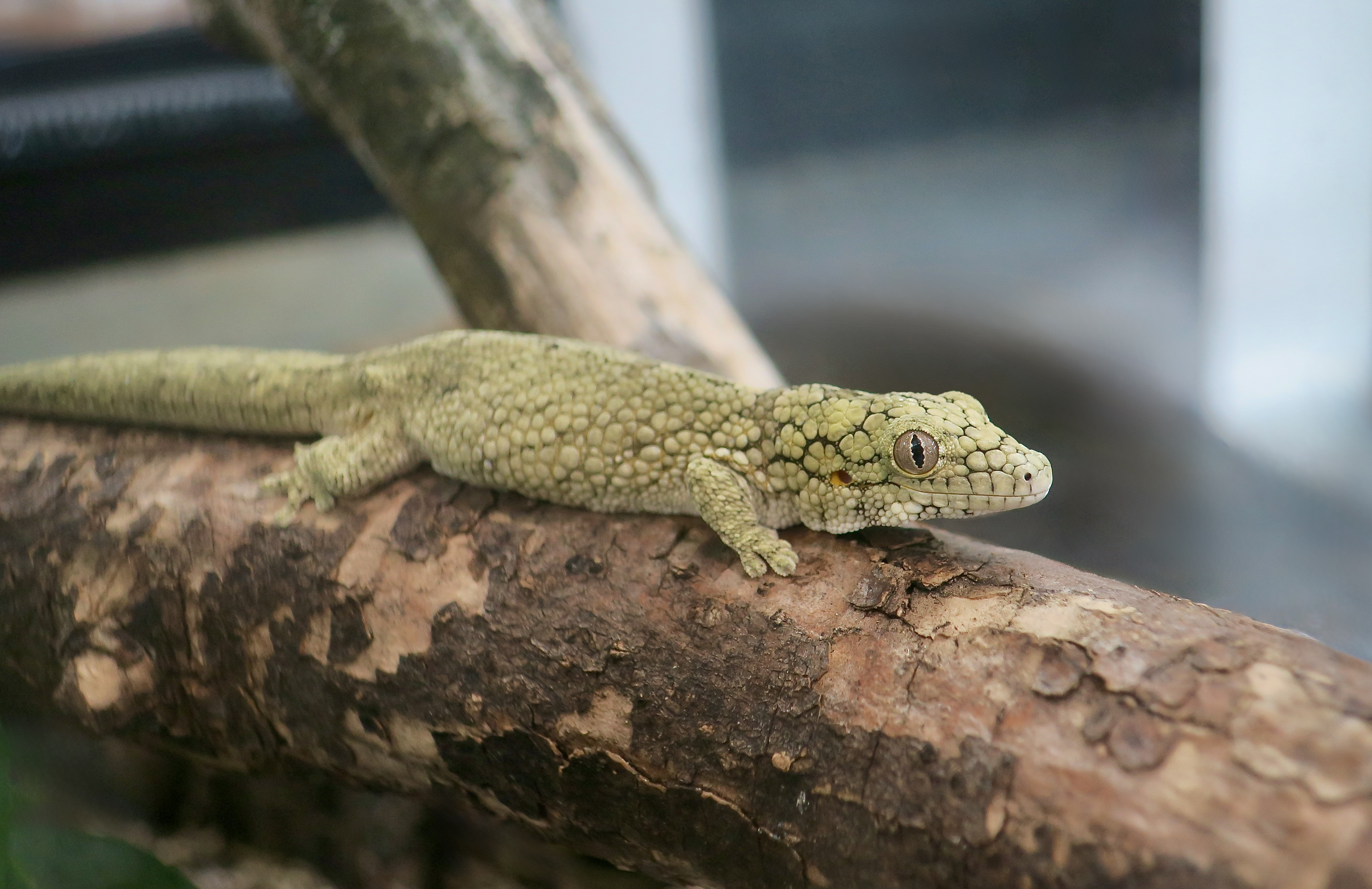

Conservation status
- Endangered (IUCN 3.1)

Scientific classification
- Kingdom: Animalia
- Phylum: Chordata
- Class: Reptilia
- Order: Squamata
- Suborder: Gekkota
- Family: Diplodactylidae
- Genus: Eurydactylodes
- Species: E. occidentalis

Binomial name
- Eurydactylodes occidentalis Bauer, Jackman, Sadlier & A. Whitaker, 2009

= Eurydactylodes occidentalis =

Species of lizard

Eurydactylodes occidentalis, the western chameleon gecko, is a species of gecko, a lizard in the family Diplodactylidae. The species is endemic to Grande Terre in New Caledonia.

== Etymology ==
The word occidentalis, meaning "western", refers to the apparent restriction of the species along the west coast of South Province on Grande Terre.

== Habitat ==
The preferred natural habitat of E. occidentalis is forest, at an altitude of 20 m (70 ft).

== Description ==
E. occidentalis is the smallest species in its genus. Its maximum recorded snout-to-vent length (SVL) is only 5.3 cm (2.1 in).

== Reproduction ==
E. occidentalis is oviparous.
