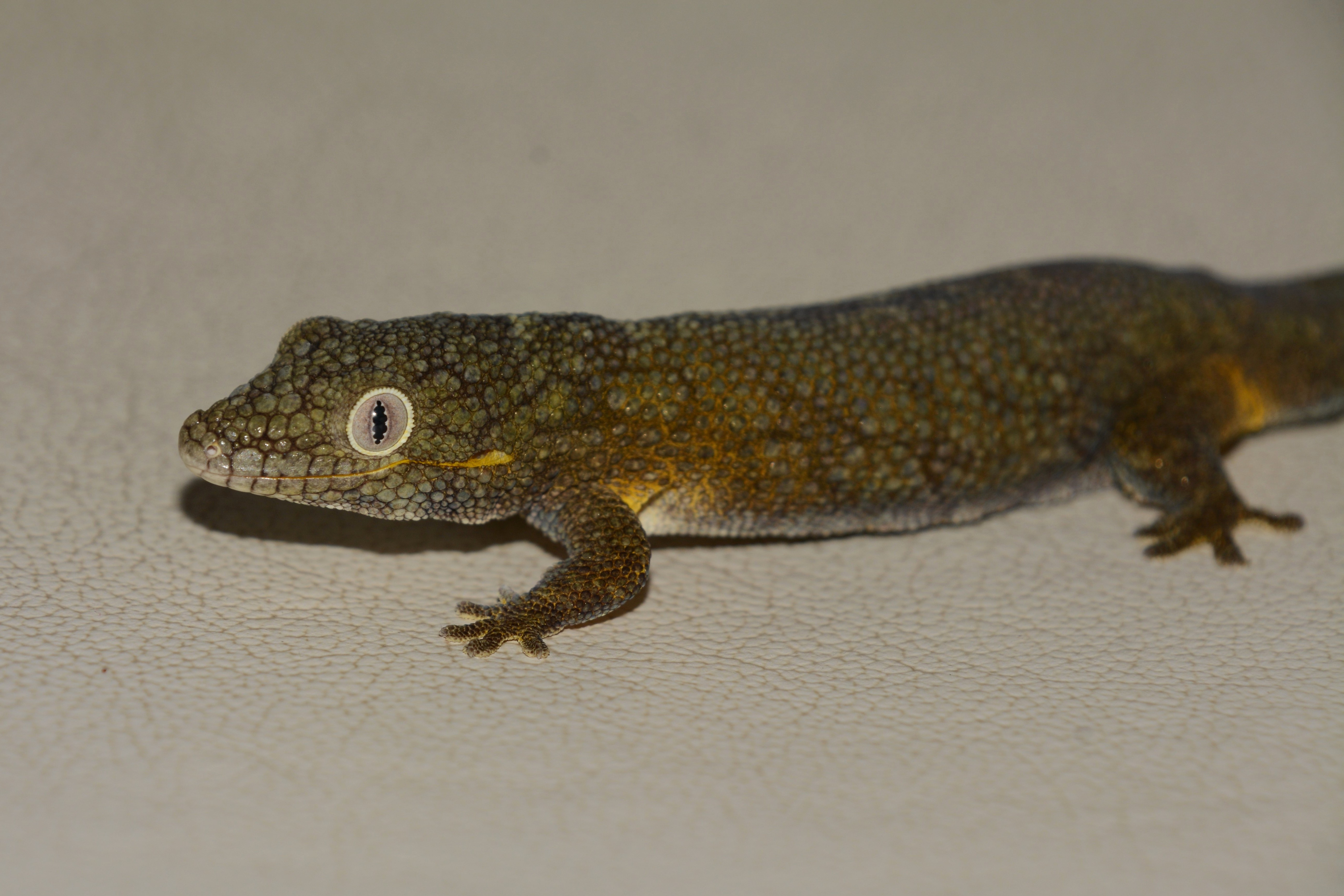

Conservation status
- Near Threatened (IUCN 3.1)

Scientific classification
- Kingdom: Animalia
- Phylum: Chordata
- Class: Reptilia
- Order: Squamata
- Suborder: Gekkota
- Family: Diplodactylidae
- Genus: Eurydactylodes
- Species: E. agricolae

Binomial name
- Eurydactylodes agricolae Henkel & Böhme, 2001

= Bauer's chameleon gecko =

Species of lizard

Bauer's chameleon gecko (Eurydactylodes agricolae) is a nocturnal species of lizard in the family Diplodactylinae. The species is endemic to Grande Terre in New Caledonia.

== Etymology ==
The specific name, agricolae, is in honor of American herpetologist Aaron Matthew Bauer. The German noun, Bauer, means "farmer" in English, which becomes agricola (genitive singular, agricolae) when translated into Latin.

== Habitat ==
The preferred natural habitats of the arboreal E. agricolae are forest and shrubland, at altitudes up to 1,000 m (3,300 ft).

== Description ==
E. agricolae may attain a snout-to-vent length (SVL) of 6 cm (2.4 in).

== Reproduction ==
E. agricolae is oviparous.
