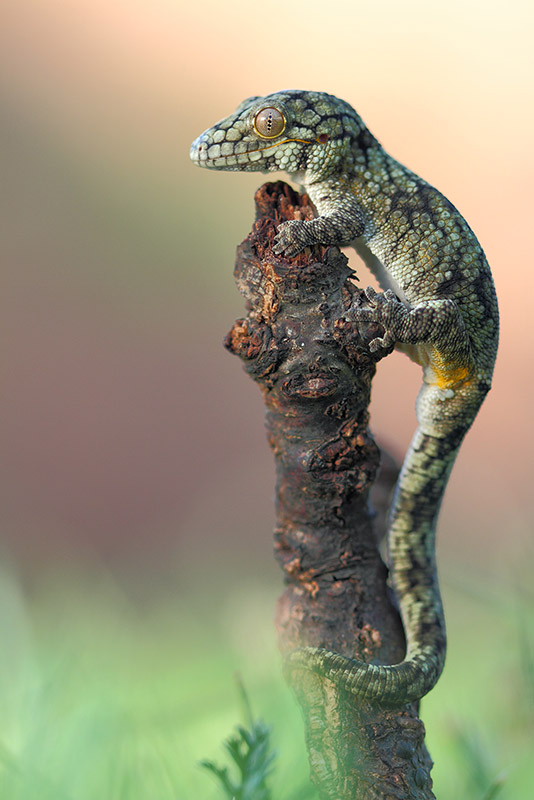
- adult male

Conservation status
- Near Threatened (IUCN 3.1)

Scientific classification
- Kingdom: Animalia
- Phylum: Chordata
- Class: Reptilia
- Order: Squamata
- Suborder: Gekkota
- Family: Diplodactylidae
- Genus: Eurydactylodes
- Species: E. vieillardi

Binomial name
- Eurydactylodes vieillardi (Bavay, 1869)

Synonyms
- Platydactylus vieillardi Bavay, 1869; Eurydactylus vieillardi — Sauvage, 1879; Eurydactylodes vieillardi — Wermuth, 1965

= Eurydactylodes vieillardi =

Species of lizard

Eurydactylodes vieillardi, sometimes known commonly as Bavay's gecko or Vieillard's chameleon gecko, is a species of lizard in the family Diplodactylidae. The species is endemic to Grande Terre in New Caledonia.

== Etymology ==
The specific name, vieillardi, is in honor of French botanist Eugène Vieillard.

== Habitat ==
The preferred natural habitats of E. vieillardi are forest and shrubland, up to an altitude of 950 m (3,120 ft).

== Description ==
E. vieillardi may attain a snout-to-vent length (SVL) of 6 cm (2.4 in).

== Reproduction ==
E. vieillardi is oviparous.
