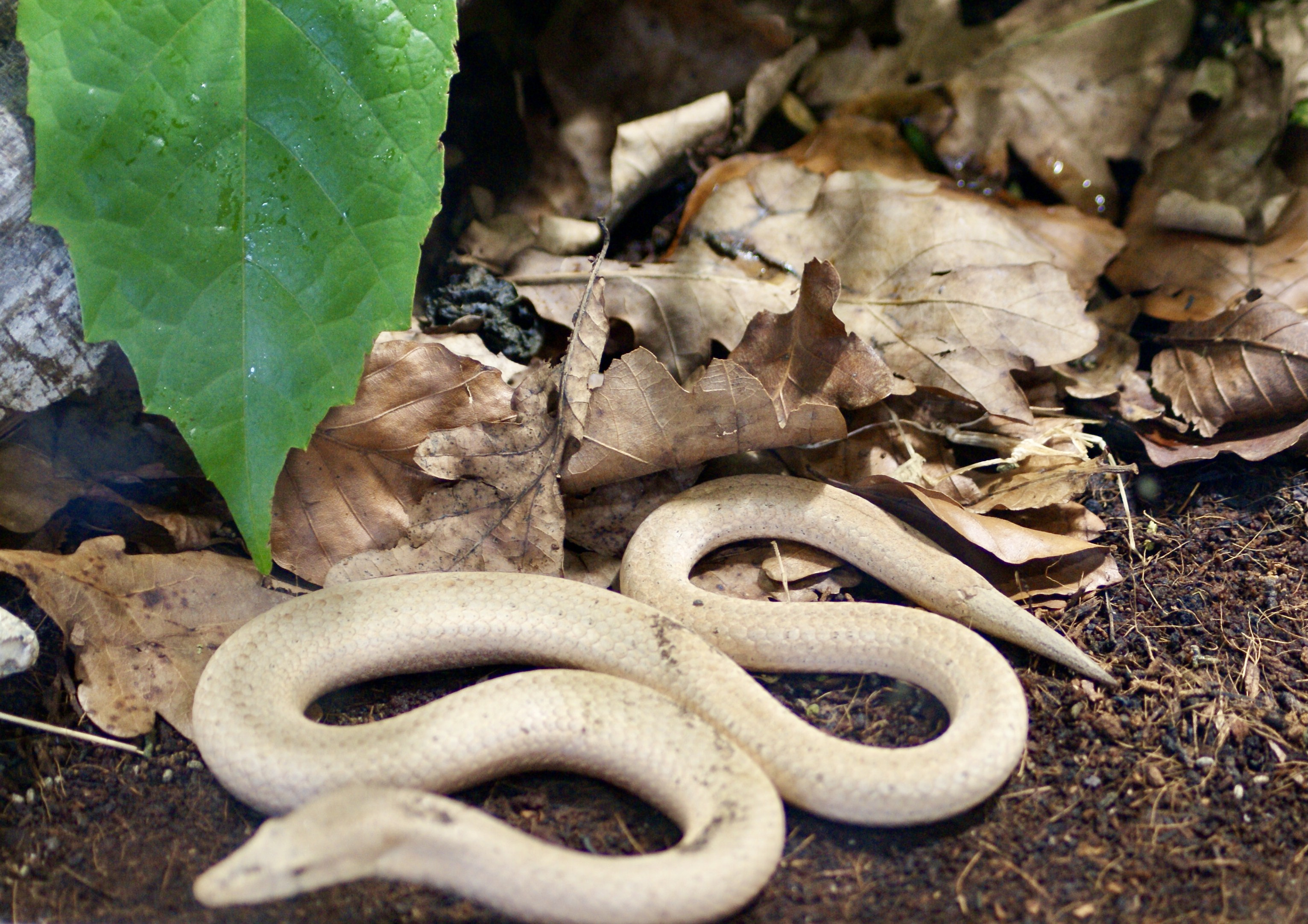

Conservation status
- Least Concern (IUCN 3.1)

Scientific classification
- Kingdom: Animalia
- Phylum: Chordata
- Class: Reptilia
- Order: Squamata
- Suborder: Gekkota
- Family: Pygopodidae
- Genus: Lialis
- Species: L. jicari

Binomial name
- Lialis jicari Boulenger, 1903

Synonyms
- Alopecosaurus cuneirostris Lindholm, 1905; Alopecosaurus cuneirostris var. inornata Lindholm, 1905

= Papua snake lizard =

Species of lizard

The Papua snake lizard (Lialis jicari), also known commonly as Jicar's snake-lizard, the New Guinea snake-lizard, and the Papua snake-lizard, is a species of legless lizard in the family Pygopodidae. The species is endemic to New Guinea including the Bismarck Archipelago.

== Etymology ==
The specific name, jicari, is in honor of Mr. A.H. Jiear, a Resident Magistrate in British New Guinea, who presented the holotype to the British Museum (Natural History). Boulenger misread the donor's surname as "Jicar".

== Habitat ==
L. jicari is found in a variety of habitats including freshwater wetlands, grassland, shrubland, savanna, and forest, at altitudes from sea level to 1,600 m (5,200 ft).

== Description ==
L. jicari is limbless. It may attain a snout-to-vent length (SVL) of 31 cm (12 in), with a tail length of 50 cm (20 in). It has 22 scales around the middle of the body, seven preanal pores, and six anal scales.

== Reproduction ==
L. jicari is oviparous.
