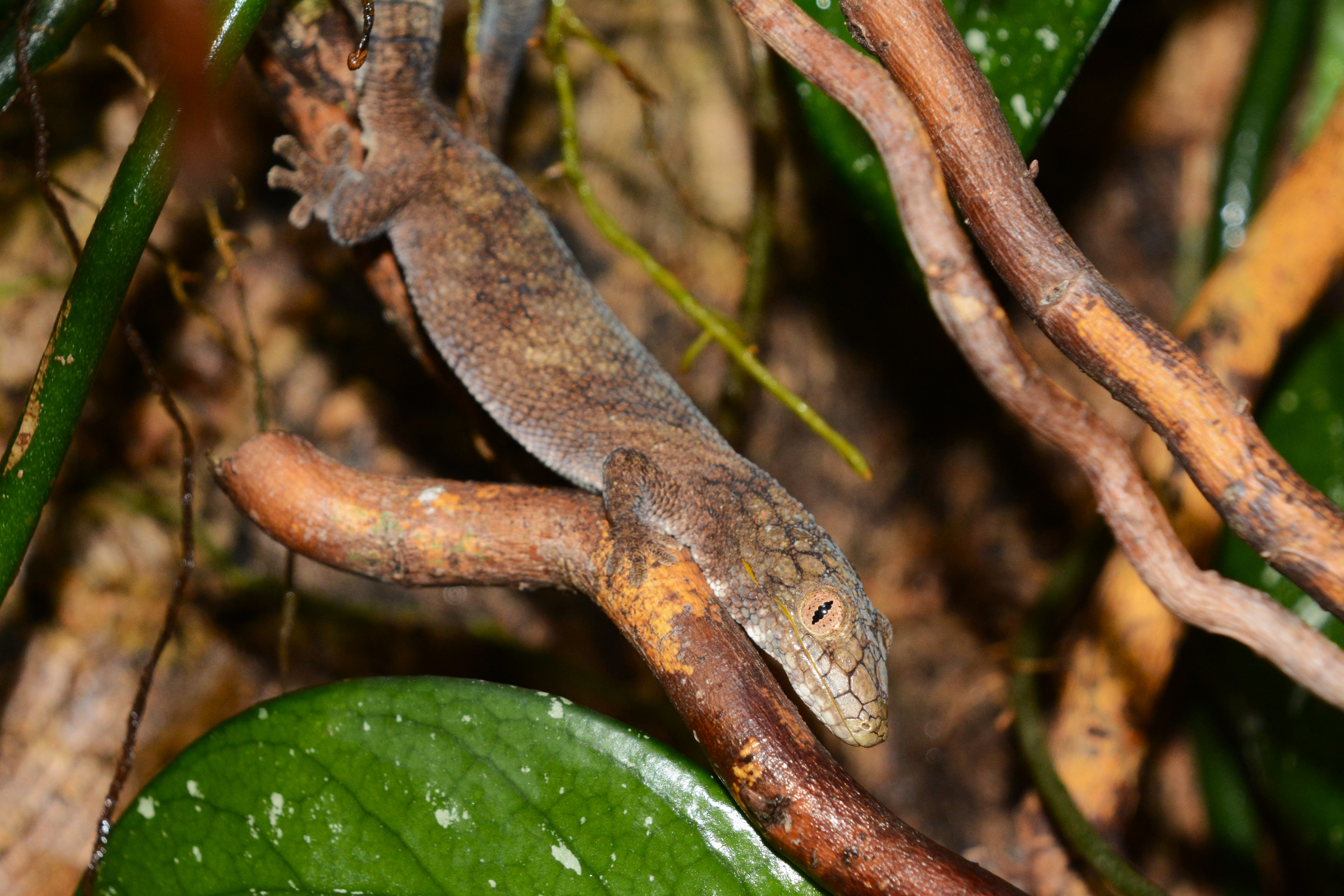

Conservation status
- Near Threatened (IUCN 3.1)

Scientific classification
- Kingdom: Animalia
- Phylum: Chordata
- Class: Reptilia
- Order: Squamata
- Suborder: Gekkota
- Family: Diplodactylidae
- Genus: Eurydactylodes
- Species: E. symmetricus

Binomial name
- Eurydactylodes symmetricus (Andersson, 1908)

Synonyms
- Eurydactylus symmetricus Andersson, 1908; Eurydactylodes symmetricus — Wermuth, 1965

= Eurydactylodes symmetricus =

Species of lizard

Eurydactylodes symmetricus, sometimes known commonly as the symmetrical gecko or the large-scaled chameleon gecko, is a species of lizard in the family Diplodactylidae. The species is endemic to Grande Terre in New Caledonia.

== Habitat ==
The preferred natural habitats of E. symmetricus are forest and shrubland, at altitudes of 20–1,050 m (66–3,445 ft).

== Description ==
E. symmetricus may attain a snout-to-vent length (SVL) of 6 cm (2.4 in).

== Reproduction ==
E. symmetricus is oviparous.
