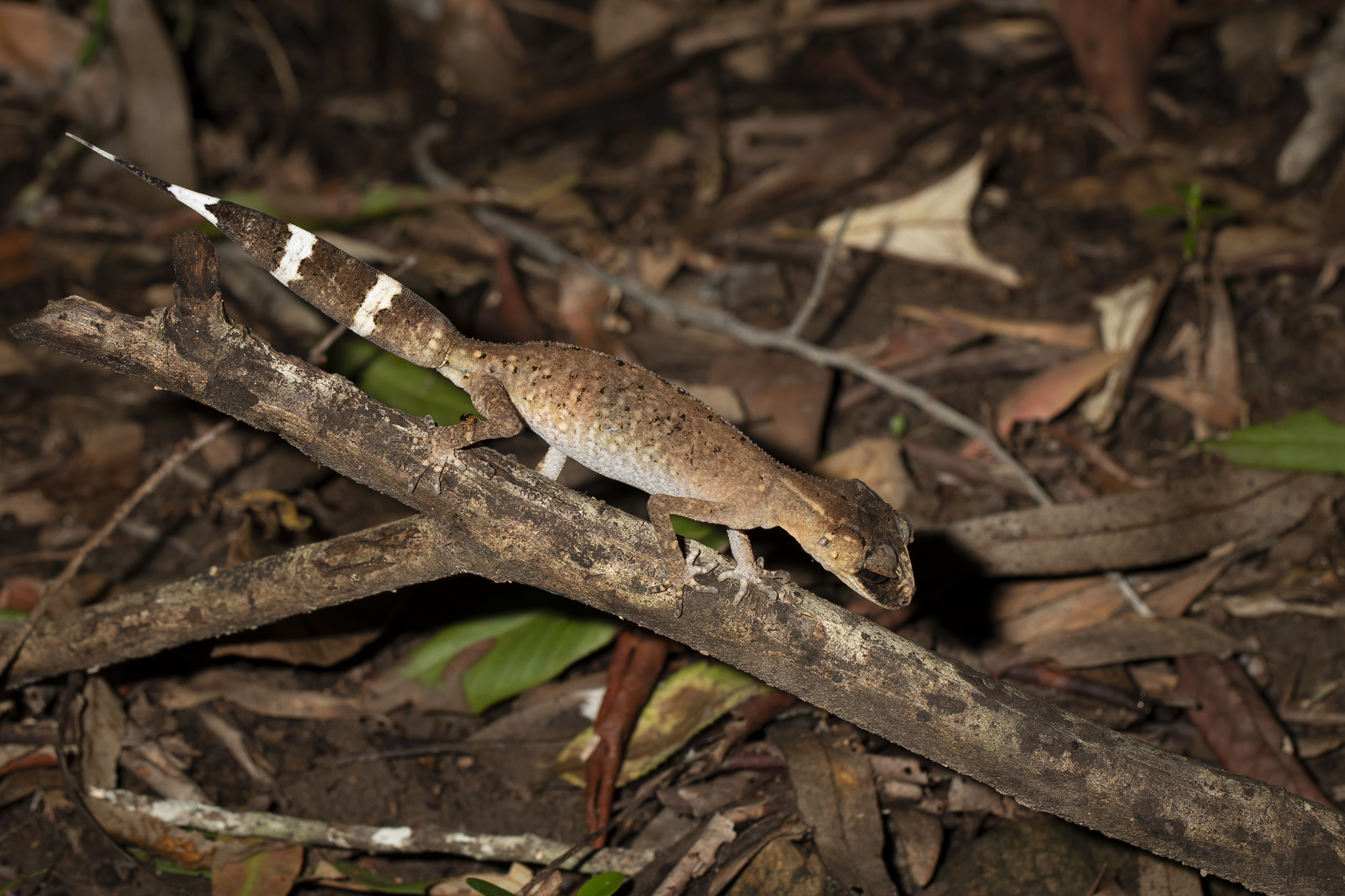

Conservation status
- Least Concern (IUCN 3.1)

Scientific classification
- Kingdom: Animalia
- Phylum: Chordata
- Class: Reptilia
- Order: Squamata
- Suborder: Gekkota
- Family: Carphodactylidae
- Genus: Carphodactylus; Günther, 1897
- Species: C. laevis

Binomial name
- Carphodactylus laevis Günther, 1897

= Carphodactylus =

Genus of lizards

Carphodactylus is a monotypic genus of geckos in the family Carphodactylidae. The genus consists of the sole species Carphodactylus laevis, commonly known as the chameleon gecko. The species is endemic to the rainforests of northeastern Australia. It is rated as Least Concern, as it is common (albeit secretive) within its range and occurs within protected areas. It currently experiences no major threats, though long-term climate change may alter or reduce its geographic distribution under some scenarios.

== Description ==
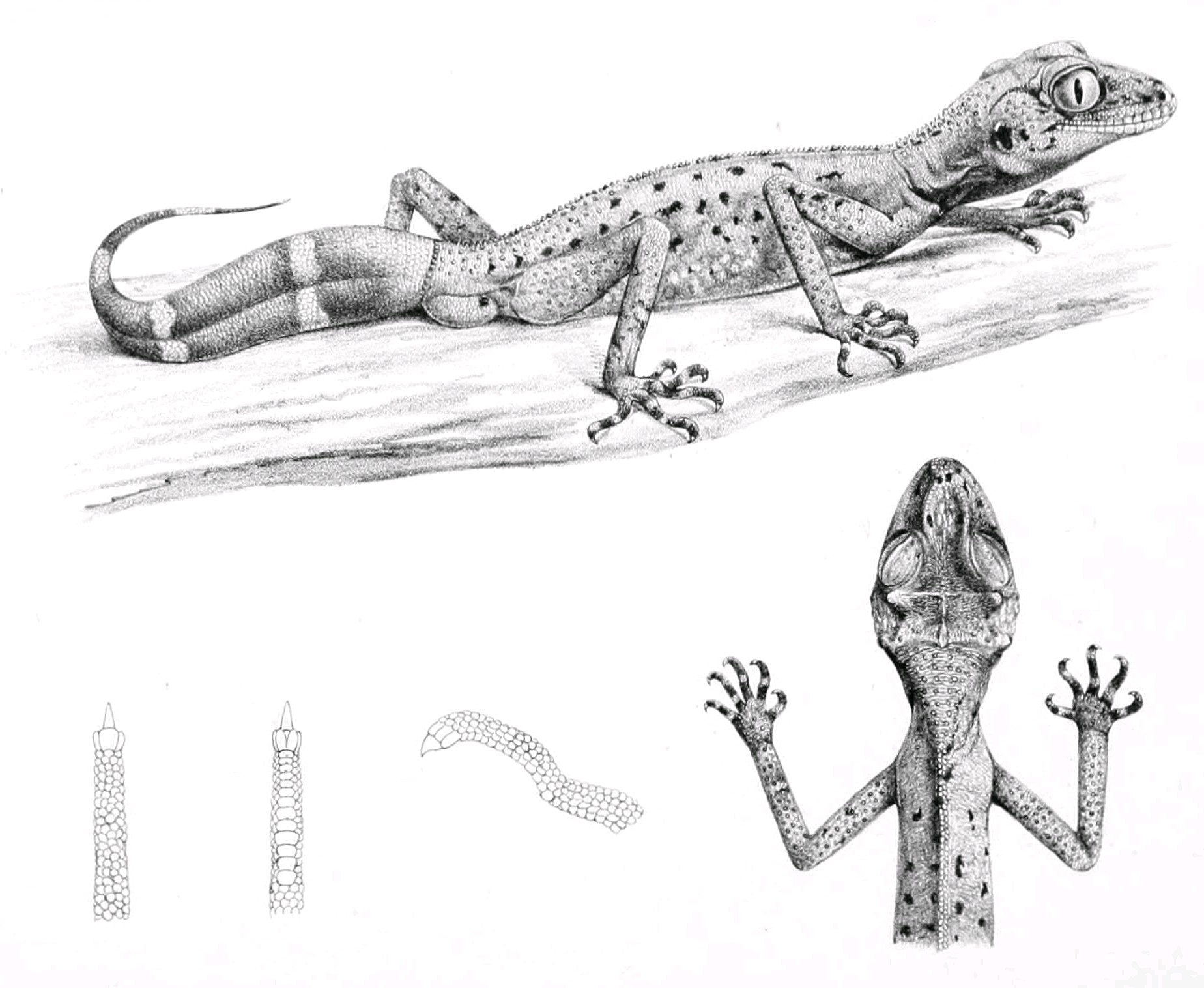
Carphodactylus laevis, illustration from original description, 1897

C. laevis has an average snout-to-vent length (SVL) of 13 cm (5.1 in). The head has large labial (lip) scales, relatively small postmental scales (behind the chin), and rounded rostral and mental shields (at the tip of the snout). The body and tail are slender and mediolaterally compressed (flattened from the side), with a thin vertebral ridge extending from the nape to the tapered tail. The limbs are long and thin, and the five-toed feet have thin and narrow digits with distinct claws and an angular profile from the side. The claws are surrounded by five enlarged scales at their base. The underside of each digit has a single row of small lamellae, each of which are slightly broadened sideways. The genus possesses preanal pores.

Coloration includes a broad black streak from the snout to the eye, and a pair of narrower streaks (black above and pale below) towards the tympanum. Dorsally, the head and body are brown, speckled with small paler brown spots and black specks concentrated around the vertebral line. The original tail is dark brown or black with four to five complete whitish vertical crossbands.

== Distribution and ecology ==
C. laevis is found in cool rainforests of northeastern Queensland, at altitudes of 400–1,400 m (1,300–4,600 ft). It is nocturnal, foraging on the leaf litter or low shrubs at night. C. laevis is oviparous. Mitochondrial DNA has been used to argue that different C. laevis populations experienced significant genetic isolation during dry periods in the Pleistocene, but that this did not result in significant phenotypic change between populations.

== Etymology ==
The generic name, Carphodactylus, is Latin meaning "twig finger". The specific name, laevis, is Latin meaning "smooth".

== Gallery ==
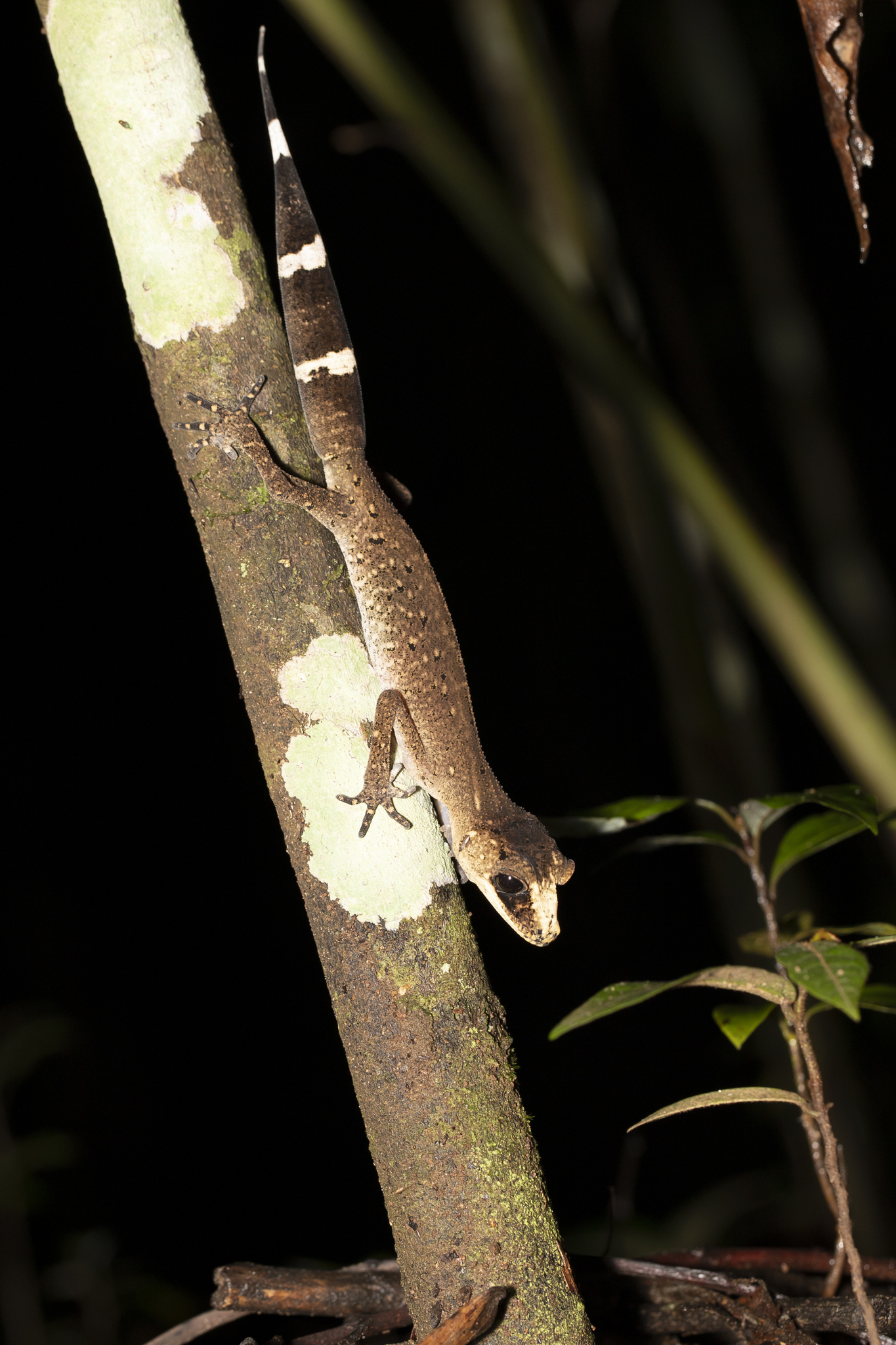

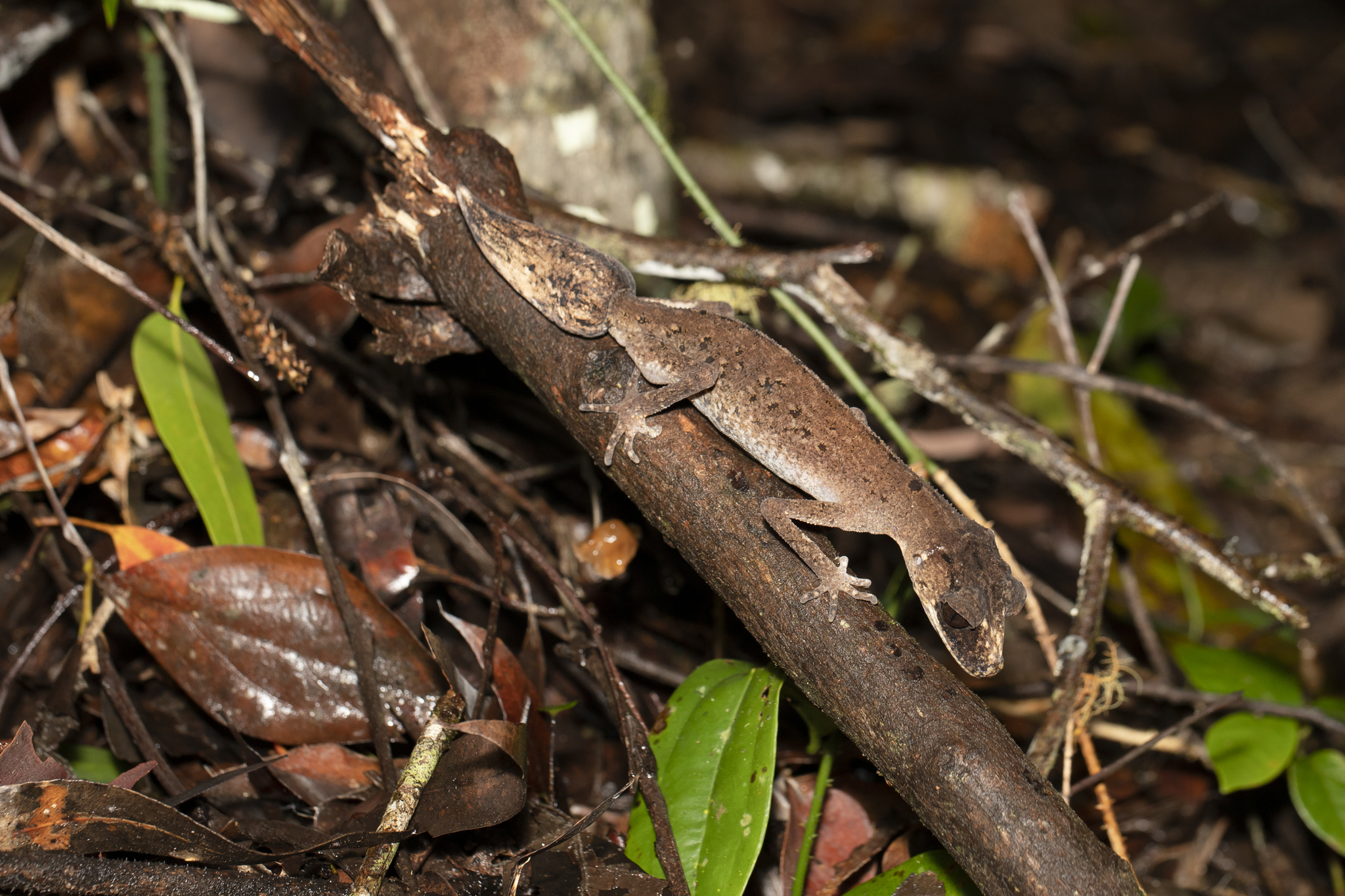
With regenerated tail

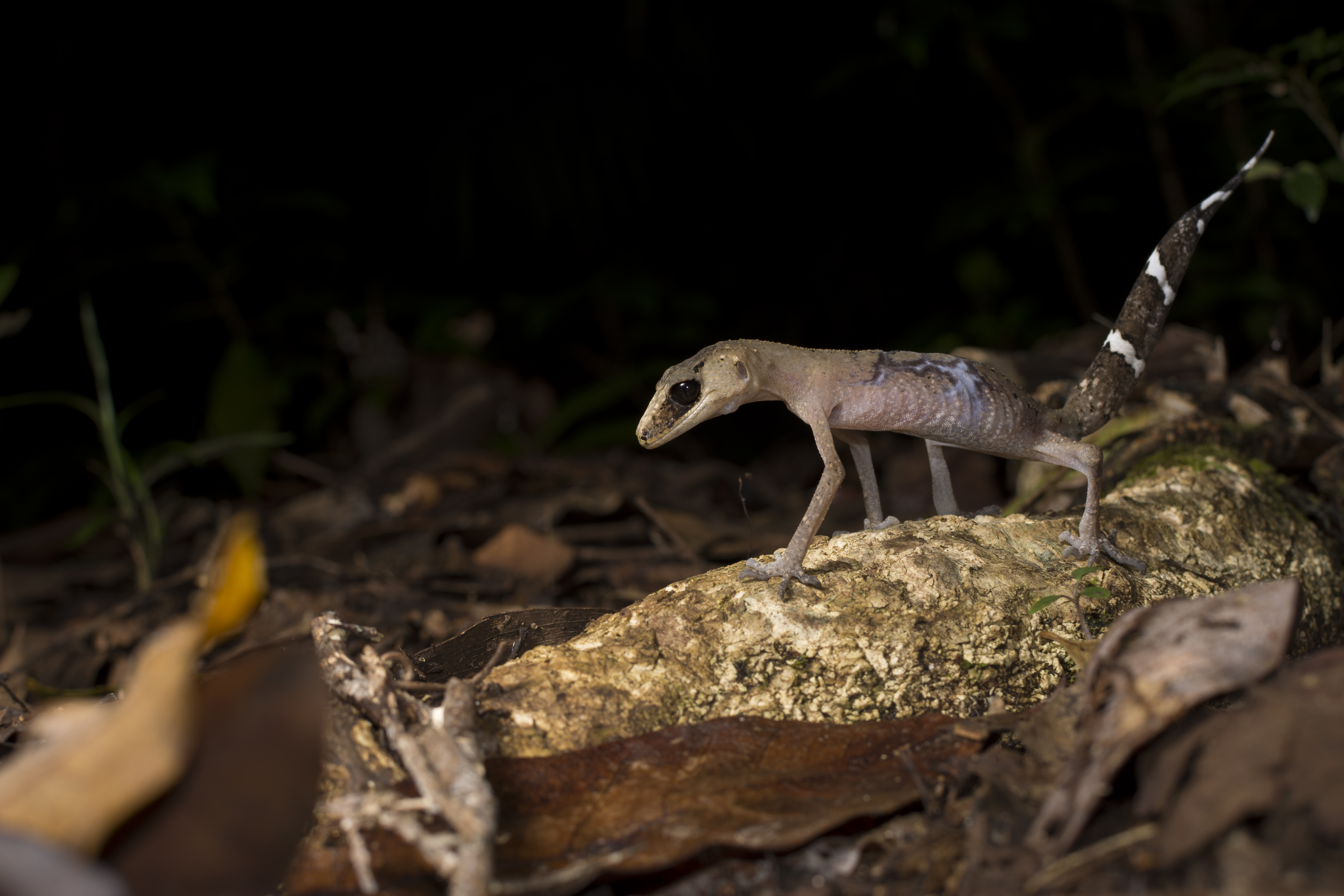

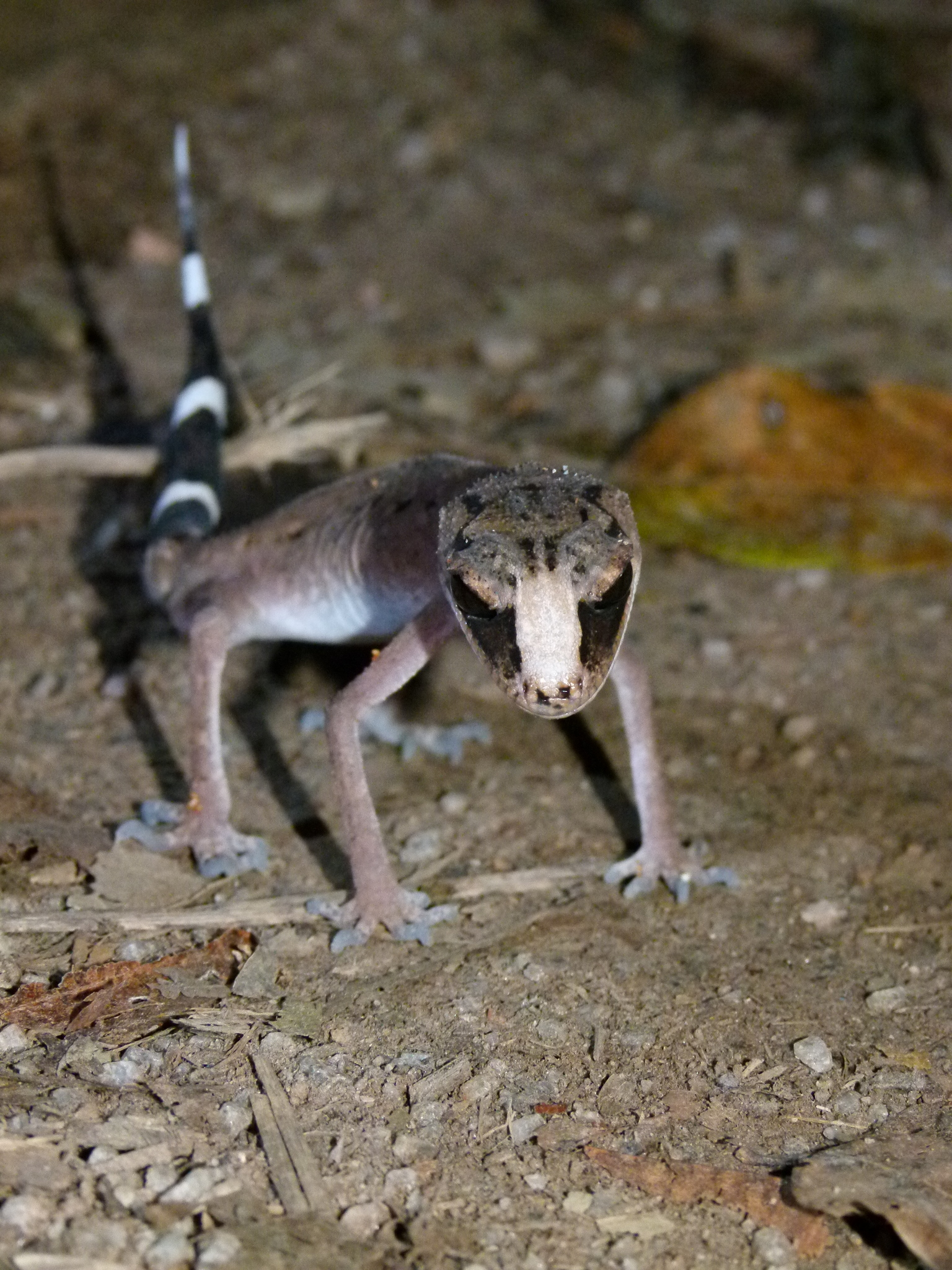
