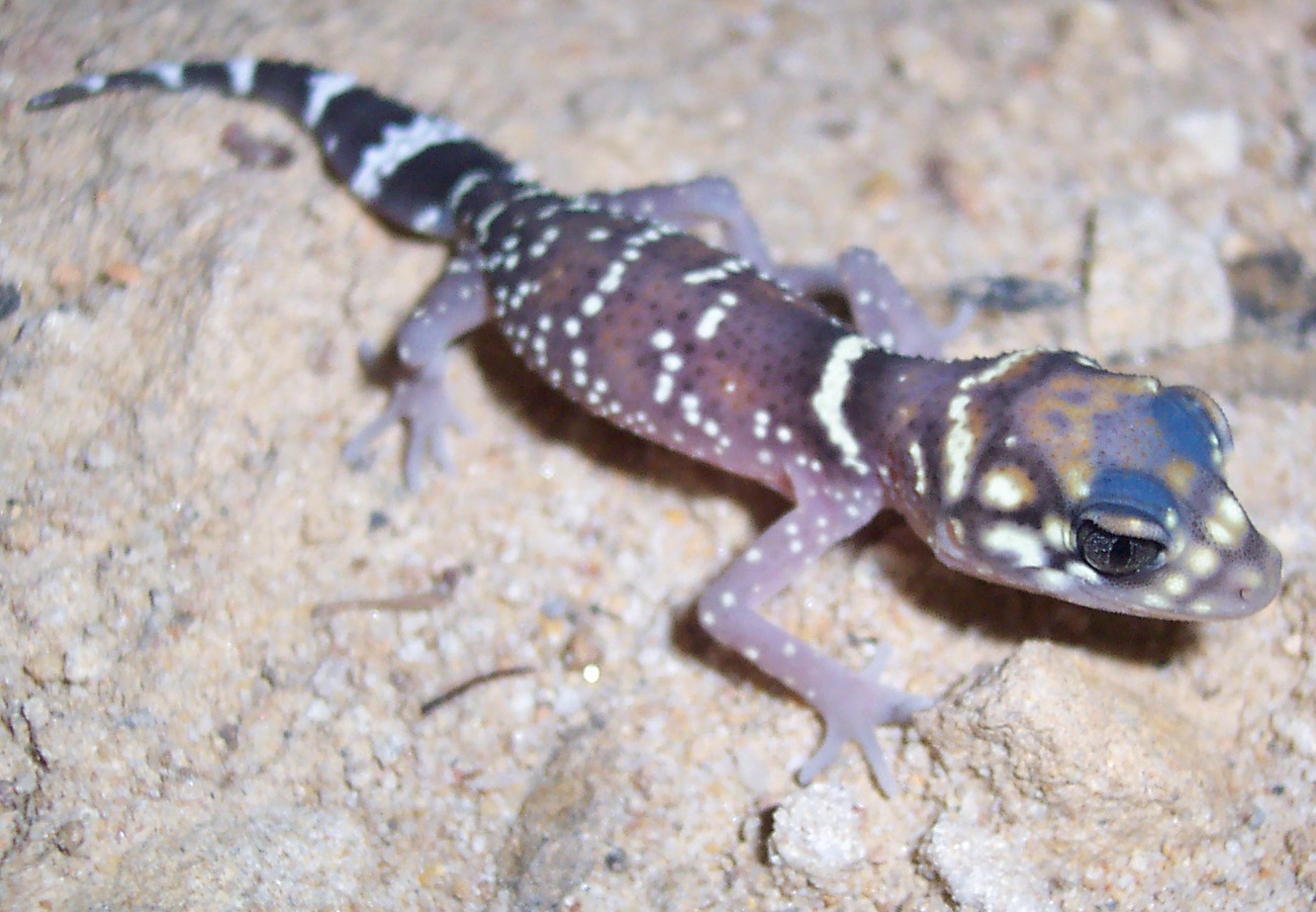
- Thick-tailed gecko (Underwoodisaurus milii)

Scientific classification
- Kingdom: Animalia
- Phylum: Chordata
- Class: Reptilia
- Order: Squamata
- Suborder: Gekkota
- Family: Carphodactylidae
- Genus: Underwoodisaurus; Wermuth, 1965

Species
- Two recognized species, see text.

= Underwoodisaurus =

Genus of lizards

Underwoodisaurus is a small genus of Australian lizards in the family Carphodactylidae. Member species are commonly known as thick-tailed geckos, along with the species Uvidicolus sphyrurus.

== Etymology ==
The generic name, Underwoodisaurus, is in honour of British herpetologist Garth Leon Underwood.

== Taxonomy ==
The genus Underwoodisaurus has a complex taxonomic history, but the currently accepted taxonomic concept follows Oliver & Bauer (2011), with a second species subsequently recognised by Doughty & Oliver (2011). Reptile systematists nowadays recognise a distinct family, Carphodactylidae, for this and some related genera.

== Species ==
There are two species which are recognised as being valid:

- Underwoodisaurus milii (Bory de Saint-Vincent, 1825) – thick-tailed gecko
- Underwoodisaurus seorsus Doughty & P. Oliver, 2011

Nota bene: A binomial authority in parentheses indicates that the species was originally described in a genus other than Underwoodisaurus. The species Uvidicolus sphyrurus is sometimes placed in the genus Underwoodisaurus.

== Description ==
Adults of some species of Underwoodisaurus can reach a snout-to-vent length (SVL) of 80 mm (3.1 in). Preanal pores are absent. The feet are generally "bird-like" with long slender digits, and the tail is carrot-shaped. The underside of the body is white, and the dorsal surface ranges from dark purplish-black through reddish-brown to pale fawn, with small white, yellow and black spots in patterns.

A thick tail is generally a sign of good health, although lack of thickness may indicate recent egg-laying.

== Geographic range and habitat ==
The genus Underwoodisaurus is endemic to Australia. These geckoes are found in a range of habitats including wet coastal heathlands, wet sclerophyll forests, arid scrubland, rocky outcrops and stony hills in eucalypt woodland.

== Ecology ==
Thick-tailed geckos shelter under leaf litter, around the bases of trees in loose bark, and in crevices.

They emerge in the evenings to hunt in open areas for crickets, cockroaches and huntsman spiders. They eat once every 3–4 days. When they see prey they will stare at it and wag their tails, then pounce. When alarmed, the thick-tailed gecko will make a barking sound or hiss. They will also raise their backs. One main predator is snakes.

== Reproduction ==
Thick-tailed geckos lay up to 2 eggs and up to 10 clutches per year. The first clutch of eggs is usually infertile. When the female is gravid the eggs are visible through the skin. The eggs take about 65 days to hatch. Their breeding season is roughly July to February.
