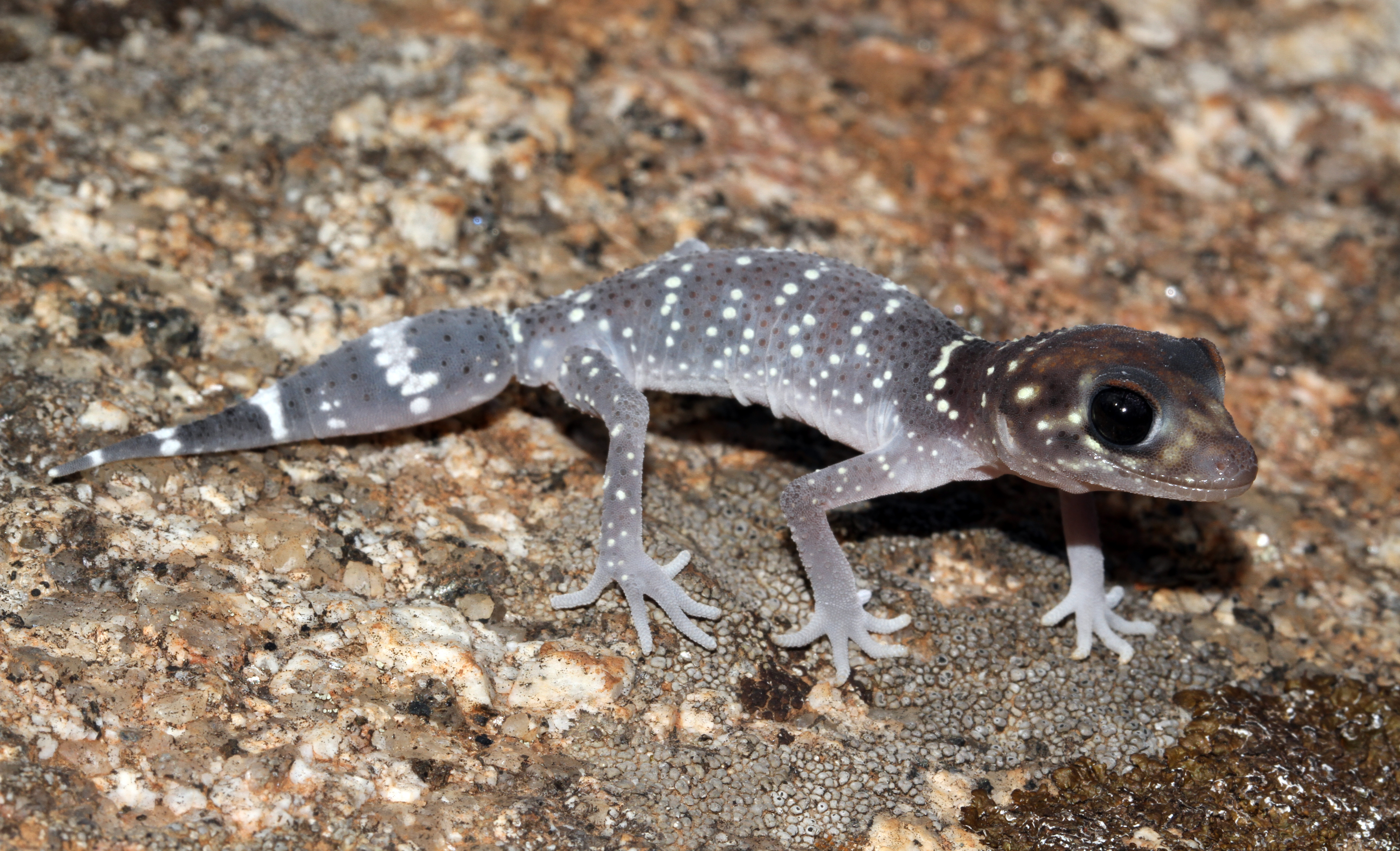
- Barking gecko (Underwoodisaurus milii)

Scientific classification
- Kingdom: Animalia
- Phylum: Chordata
- Class: Reptilia
- Order: Squamata
- Suborder: Gekkota
- Superfamily: Pygopodoidea
- Family: Carphodactylidae; Kluge, 1967

Genera
- Seven, see text.

= Carphodactylidae =

Family of lizards

The Carphodactylidae, informally known as the southern padless geckos, are a family of geckos, lizards in the infraorder Gekkota. The family consists of 34 described species in 7 genera, all of which are endemic to Australia. They belong to the superfamily Pygopodoidea (or Diplodactyloidea), an ancient group of east Gondwanan geckos now only found in Australasia. Despite their well-developed limbs, molecular phylogenies have demonstrated that Carphodactylidae is the sister group to Pygopodidae, a highly specialized family of legless lizards.

Carphodactylids, despite being the most species-poor family of geckos, are still diverse in habits. Many have unusual, specialized tails with reduced rates of autotomy. They lack adhesive toepads and instead cling to bark or substrate with sharply curved claws and a limited array of lamellae. Carphodactylids are relatively large by gecko standards; most are nocturnal and all are oviparous, with a typical clutch size of two eggs. Unlike most Australian geckos, species diversity is concentrated in humid forests along the northeastern edge of Australia. Nevertheless, some genera are diverse in arid regions as well.

== Genera ==
The following genera are considered members of the Carphodactylidae:

Genus	Image	Type species	Taxon author	Common name	Species
Carphodactylus	C. laevis	C. laevis Günther, 1897	Günther, 1897	Chameleon gecko	1
Nephrurus	N. laevissimus	N. asper Günther, 1876	Günther, 1876	Knob-tailed geckos	11
Orraya		O. occultus (Couper, Covacevich & Moritz, 1993)	Couper, Covacevich, Schneider & Hoskin, 2000	Long-necked northern leaf-tailed gecko	1
Phyllurus	P. nepthys	P. platurus (Shaw, 1790)	Schinz, 1822	Australian leaf-tailed geckos	11
Saltuarius	S. swaini	S. cornutus (Ogilby, 1892)	Couper, Covacevich & Moritz, 1993	Australian leaf-tailed geckos	7
Underwoodisaurus	U. milii	U. milii (Bory de Saint-Vincent, 1825)	Wermuth, 1965	Thick-tailed or barking geckos	2
Uvidicolus		U. sphyrurus (Ogilby, 1892)	Oliver & Bauer, 2011	Border thick-tailed gecko	1

== Classification ==
=== Historical usage (Carphodactylini) ===
Members of the family now known as Carphodactylidae were first grouped together in Kluge (1967)'s reconfiguration of gecko systematics. He named a tribe, Carphodactylini, which included Carphodactylus, Nephrurus, and Phyllurus ("padless carphodactylins") as close relatives in a subgroup. The tribe also included Pseudothecadactylus and all New Zealand and New Caledonian geckos ("padded carphodactylins") in another subgroup. Carphodactylini was diagnosed by a large patch of preanal pores formed by multiple rows, though these pores were noted as vestigial in Nephrurus and absent in Phyllurus.

Under Kluge's classification scheme, Carphodactylini was the sister group to Diplodactylini, which contained other Australian legged geckos. Both tribes formed the subfamily Diplodactylinae within the family Pygopodidae, alongside the legless lizards of the subfamily Pygopodinae. "Padless carphodactylins" (particularly Carphodactylus) were considered the most primitive and generalized members of Carphodactylini, and by extension Diplodactylinae. A morphological phylogenetic analysis by Bauer (1990) generally supported Kluge's classification scheme, though the internal relationships of carphodactylin species were very different.

Summary of Kluge's classification scheme:

- Pygopodidae
  - Pygopodinae
  - Diplodactylinae
    - Diplodactylini
    - Carphodactylini
      - "padless carphodactylins"
        - Carphodactylus
        - - Phyllurus
          - Nephrurus
      - "padded carphodactylins"
        - Pseudothecadactylus
        - - - Rhacodactylus
            - Eurydactylodes
          - - Bavayia
            - - Naultinus
              - - Hoplodactylus
                - Heteropholis

Results of Bauer, 1990:

- Carphodactylini
  - "padless carphodactylins"
    - Nephrurus
    - - Phyllurus
      - Carphodactylus
  - "padded carphodactylins"
    - Naultinus
    - - - "Hoplodactylus" (paraphyletic)
        - - Bavayia
          - - Rhacodactylus
            - Eurydactylodes

However, the monophyly and structure of Carphodactylini (as defined by morphological traits) started to become unclear once molecular phylogenies were developed. King (1987) found that Nephrurus and Phyllurus apparently retained an ancestral chromosome structure, but that Carphodactylus, "padded carphodactylins", and several species of Oedura (a supposed diplodactylin) shared a derived structure, necessitating a major revision of Kluge's structure. However, there is much debate over whether chromosomes are useful for inferring gecko systematics. Donnellan et al. (1999) estimated gecko relationships using C-mos, a nuclear gene conserved throughout squamates. Their results considered Carphodactylini to be a paraphyletic assemblage, with Rhacodactylus and Pseudothecadactylus incrementally closer to diplodactylins (including Oedura).

Simplified results of Donnellan et al., 1999, focusing on Australasian geckos:

- - Pygopods
  - Diplodactylinae
    - - Nephrurus
      - Carphodactylus
    - - Rhacodactylus
      - - Pseudothecadactylus
        - Diplodactylini

=== Modern usage (Carphodactylidae) ===
Carphodactylidae, in its present-day usage, was codified by Han et al. (2004). They expanded on the study of Donnellan et al. (1999), and found that Carphodactylini and Diplodactylinae, as previously used, were polyphyletic. "Padless carphodactylins" formed a clade sister to pygopodines, while "padded carphodactylins" formed a grade of geckos basal to diplodactylins. This prompted several renames of major clades. The clade of "padless carphodactylins" was given the new family Carphodactylidae, while the family Diplodactylidae was erected to encompass traditional diplodactylins and "padded carphodactylins". The family Pygopodidae was basically restricted to the legless pygopodines, and subsequent studies would rename the Australasian radiation to Pygopodoidea or Diplodactyloidea.

Simplified results of Han et al., 2004, using new names as defined in the study:

- Gekkota
  - Eublepharidae
  - Gekkonoidea
  - - Diplodactylidae
    - - Pygopodidae
      - Carphodactylidae
        - Phyllurus
        - - Carphodactylus
          - Nephrurus

Although placing carphodactylids sister to pygopodids was an unusual result, nearly all subsequent molecular phylogenies have supported it. Shared morphological traits are scant, but the two families both have an unusually complex squamosal with its lower end wrapping around the rear branch of the parietal. Oliver & Bauer (2011) looked into carphodactylid ingroup relationships in more depth using an analysis based on C-mos along with RAG1 (a nuclear gene) and ND2 (a mitochondrial gene). They had difficulty with resolving the base of Carphodactylidae, but strongly supported the erection of a new genus, Uvidicolus. Skipwith et al. (2019) found a different result while running phylogenetic analyses on 4268 ultra-conserved elements (UCEs) in diplodactyloid geckos. Their analysis placed Orraya as the earliest-diverging carphodactylid, suggesting that the ancestral habit for the family may have been similar to the cryptic leaf-tailed genera (Orraya, Phyllurus, Saltuarius).

Simplified results of the combined nuclear and mitochondrial analysis of Oliver & Bauer, 2011:

- Pygopodoidea
  - Diplodactylidae
  - - Pygopodidae
    - Carphodactylidae
      - Carphodactylus
      - - - Saltuarius
          - Phyllurus
        - - Uvidicolus
          - - Underwoodisaurus
            - Nephrurus

Simplified results of Skipwith et al., 2019:

- Diplodactyloidea
  - Diplodactylidae
  - - Pygopodidae
    - Carphodactylidae
      - Orraya
      - - - Saltuarius
          - Phyllurus
        - - Carphodactylus
          - - Uvidicolus
            - - Underwoodisaurus
              - Nephrurus
