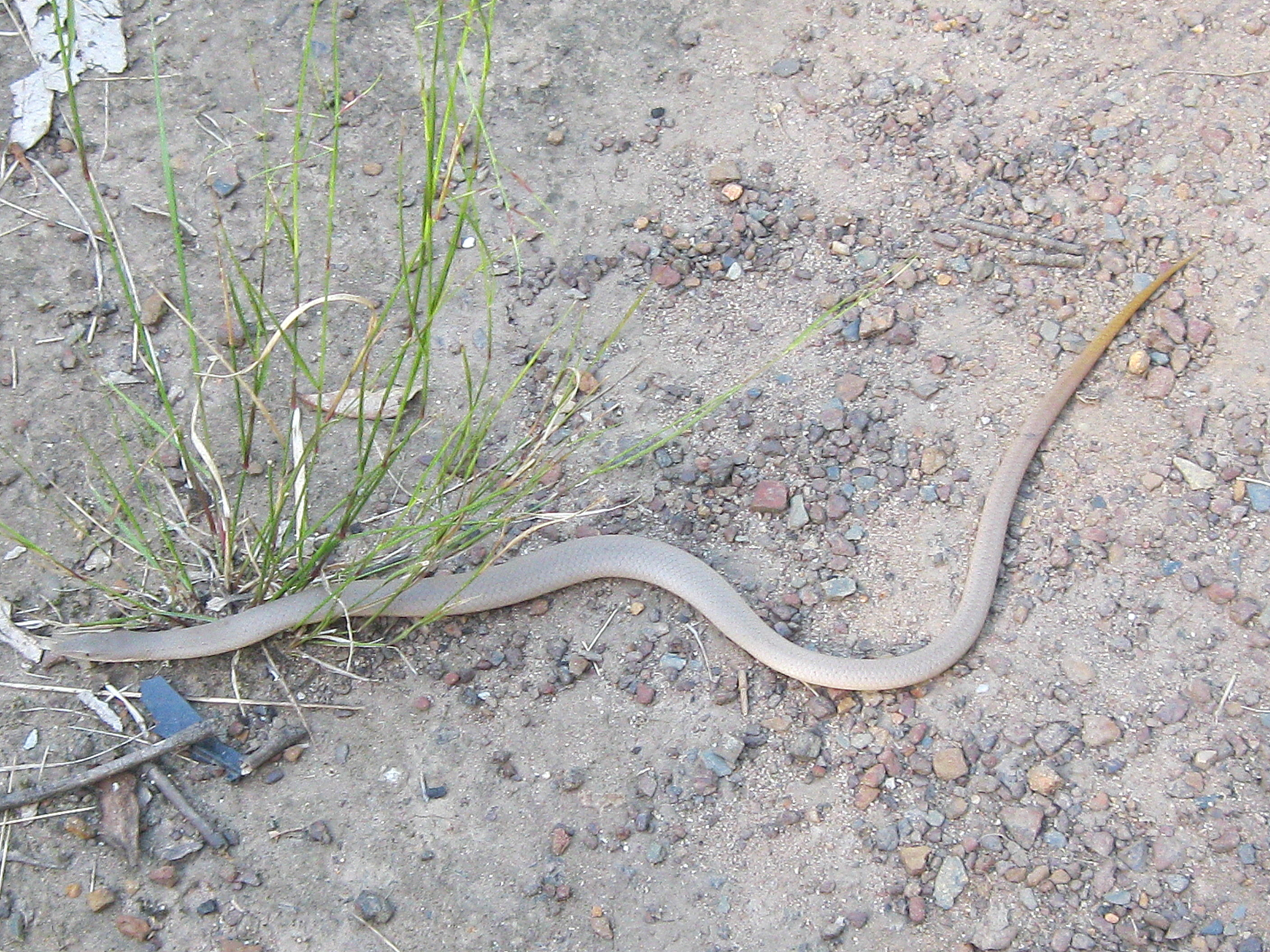
- Burton's legless lizard (Lialis burtonis)

Scientific classification
- Kingdom: Animalia
- Phylum: Chordata
- Class: Reptilia
- Order: Squamata
- Suborder: Gekkota
- Family: Pygopodidae
- Genus: Lialis; Gray, 1835
- Geographic range of the genus Lialis in Australia and New Guinea.

= Lialis =

Genus of lizards

Lialis is a genus of legless lizards in the family Pygopodidae. The genus is native to Australia and New Guinea.

== Diet ==
Lizards in the genus Lialis specialize in eating skinks. They have hinged teeth and kinetic skull joints which flex allowing them to swallow their prey whole.

== Reproduction ==
Lizards in the genus Lialis exhibit oviparity.

== Species ==
The following two species are recognized as being valid.

- Lialis burtonis Gray, 1835
- Lialis jicari Boulenger, 1903
