= Orraya =

Conservation status
- Vulnerable (IUCN 3.1)

Scientific classification
- Kingdom: Animalia
- Phylum: Chordata
- Class: Reptilia
- Order: Squamata
- Suborder: Gekkota
- Family: Carphodactylidae
- Genus: Orraya; Couper, Covacevich, C. Schneider & C. Hoskin, 2000
- Species: O. occultus

Binomial name
- Orraya occultus (Couper, Covacevich & Moritz, 1993)

Synonyms
- Saltuarius occultus Couper, Covacevich & Moritz, 1993; Orraya occultus — Couper, Covacevich, C. Schneider & C. Hoskin, 2000

Genus of lizards

Orraya is a monotypic genus of lizard in the family Carphodactylidae. The genus contains the sole species Orraya occultus, also known commonly as the McIlwraith leaf-tailed gecko or the long-necked northern leaf-tailed gecko. The species is endemic to Australia.

== Geographic range ==
O. occultus is restricted to higher elevations in the McIlwraith Range in northeastern Queensland.

== Habitat ==
The preferred natural habitat of O. occultus is forest, at altitudes of 500–825 m (1,640–2,707 ft).

== Description ==
O. occultus may attain a snout-to-vent length (SVL) of almost 11 cm (4.3 in). It is moderately spinose, and has a very long, thin neck.

== Reproduction ==
O. occultus is oviparous.
