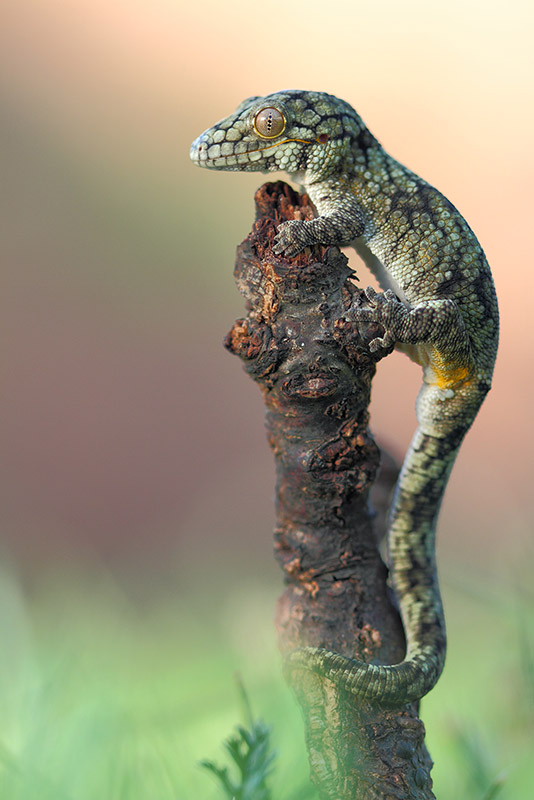
- Eurydactylodes vieillardi (adult male)

Scientific classification
- Kingdom: Animalia
- Phylum: Chordata
- Class: Reptilia
- Order: Squamata
- Suborder: Gekkota
- Family: Diplodactylidae
- Genus: Eurydactylodes; Wermuth, 1965

Species
- See text

= Eurydactylodes =

Genus of lizards

Eurydactylodes is a small genus of geckos commonly referred to as chameleon geckos from the subfamily Diplodactylidae, endemic to New Caledonia and few adjacent islands. Within the Diplodactylidae, Eurydactylodes resides in the Carphodactylini tribe, and consists of four species. All species share similar morphology as well as lifestyle and habits. The first of the Eurydactylodes species to be classified, E. vieillardi, was discovered in 1869.

== Species ==
Eurydactylodes comprises four species:

Image	Scientific name	Common name	Distribution
A brown lizard with greenish spots	Eurydactylodes agricolae Henkel & Böhme, 2001	Bauer's chameleon gecko	New Caledonia
A yellowish lizard on a branch	Eurydactylodes occidentalis Bauer et al., 2009		New Caledonia
A brown lizard surrounded by branches	Eurydactylodes symmetricus (Andersson, 1908)	symmetrical gecko	New Caledonia
	Eurydactylodes vieillardi (Bavay, 1869)	Vieillard's chameleon gecko, Bavay's gecko	New Caledonia

Nota bene: A binomial authority in parentheses indicates that the species was originally described in a genus other than Eurydactylodes.

== Appearance and anatomy ==
=== Body ===
Eurydactylodes geckos are approximately 55mm in length with a laterally compressed and narrow body shape, whom are covered in enlarged scales which are smooth and flattened along the dorsal body. These geckos are pale green in colouration yet lack peritoneal pigmentation. They also feature high, prominent spines as well as an increased amount of inscriptional ribs which are infrequent amongst other gekkota. On the back of the hindlimb there are loose folds of skin. Species of Eurydactylodes are closely related in appearance to the Rhacodactylus genus.

=== Head ===
Their head has large and flattened anterior headshields as well as an indentation of unscaled skin between the jaw and ear opening which may be complete or partial – and is the primary diagnostic character used to distinguish Eurydactylodes species. Enlarged endolymphatic sacs are located extracranially, and the tongue and mouth lining is yellow or orange. Premaxilla are completely paired, and the maxilla is in close contact with the frontal. The jugal bone is large and in contact with the gecko's infraorbital processes while ornamentation upon the dorsal surface of the skull is present. Eurydactylodes have 27 scleral ossicles present in one eyeball and nasal process which is wide, short and large. These geckos also have approximately 30 premaxillary and 30 dental teeth which are conical and blunt. Such teeth are also homodont and pleurodont and increase in size anteriorly.

=== Tail ===
Eurydactylodes geckos have a long and slender tail – being approximately the same length as their body and possessing a snout-vent length of 100% - and are round in cross section. The tail is muscular and prehensile, aided by a subcaudal scansorial pad and adhesive subcaudal tissue with soft, long hairs. Covered in numerous small scales, the tail also has pores which are located near the anal opening and are concentrated in a large singular patch. A caudal glandular ability enables the serial openings in the tail to squirt a defensive secretion. Regenerated tails appear similar to the gecko's previous tail.

=== Digits ===
The digits of the species within the Eurydactylodes genus are short and slender as well as dilated and strongly depressed. Distal phalangeal elements are neither compressed nor raised and follow gekkonid formula of 2-3-4-5-3 in hands and 2-3-4-5-4 in feet. All digits possess claws which are high at the base, compressed, robust and decurved and feature large, singular expanded pads underneath. Webbing between digits is lacking or absent completely.

== Behaviour and diet ==
Eurydactylodes geckos are actively mobile yet slow moving and able to live for over a decade. These geckos are arboreal and spend little time on the ground. These geckos display diurnality, and choose to perch on the stalks and leaves of plants even in periods of inactivity as opposed to seeking cover. When threatened or approached, Eurydactylodes geckos may flatten their bodies against substrate, flee, hiss, growl or croak without a physical display or bite without warning. All Eurydactylodes species possess a defensive mechanism present in their tail which enables them to squirt a sticky liquid when stressed. In accordance with gekkonidae, the genus display ability of crypsis, possess an ability to lick their eyeballs in order to keep them clean and are insectivores yet also eat worms, fruit, and flower nectar.

== Habitat ==
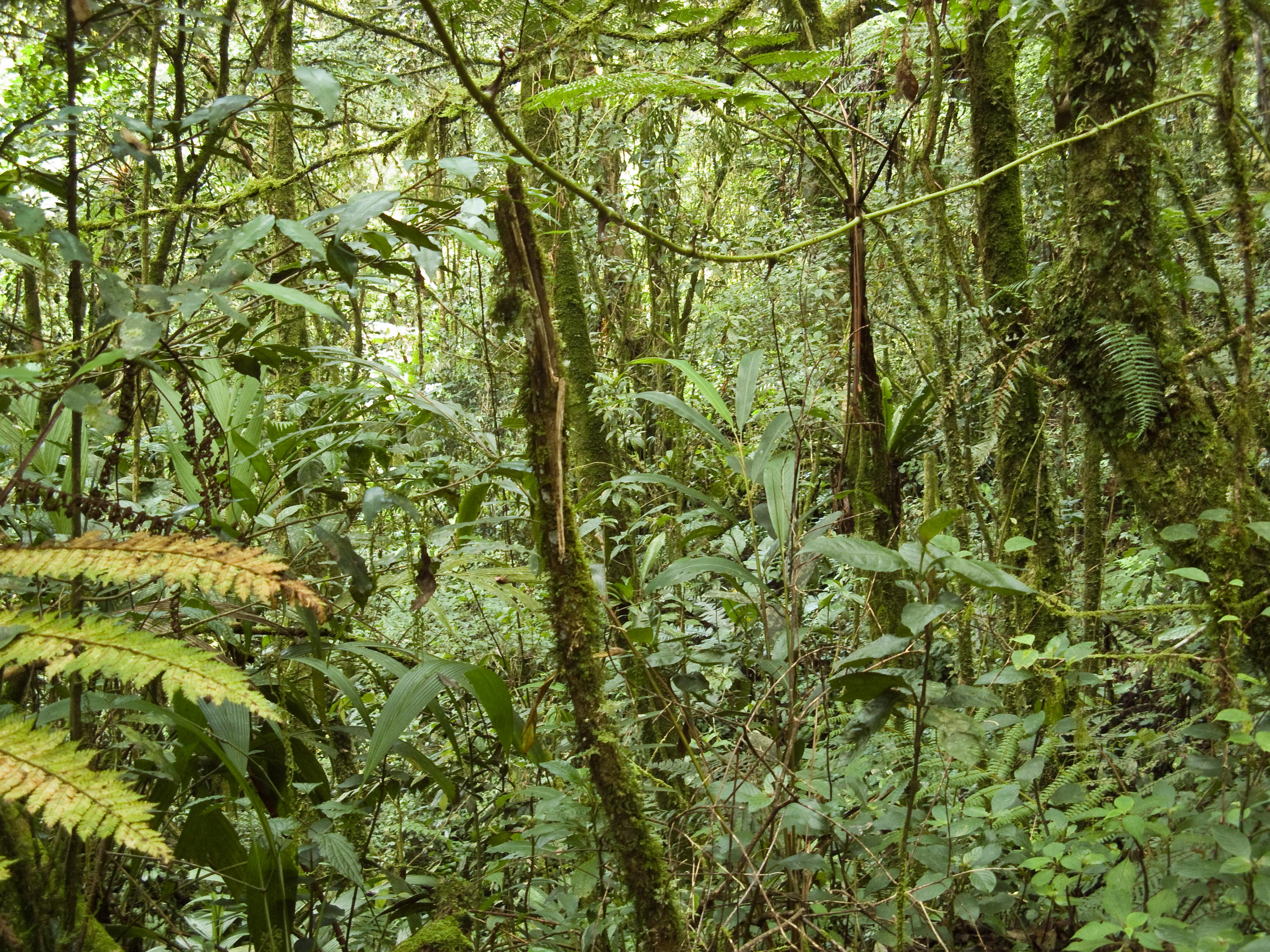
Montane tropical forest

This genus of geckos inhabits a variety of woodland environments including Maquis shrublands, sclerophyll forest, gallery forest and montane forest. Such forests are humid with a tropical/subtropical climate, with both high and low rainfall, and offer opportunity for the arboreal geckos to perch on plants including trees, shrubs, vines, sedges, grasses and ferns. All geckos within the genus have been recorded at 20 metres above sea level, and have an upper elevation limit of approximately 1000 metres above sea level except for E. occidentalis with an upper limit of 20 metres.

== Reproduction ==
Eurydactylodes geckos are oviparous, and only breed once a year. They lay a hard and mostly impermeable shelled egg which is composed of calcium carbonate. These eggs are among the largest relative to female body size of any gecko. Such eggs are initially pliable yet harden on exposure to air, and are more elongated and elliptical in shape in comparison to other gekkonine subfamilies. Enlarged endolymphatic sacs along each side of the neck are postulated to act as reservoirs storing calcareous material aiding in egg shell formation – being larger in females and increasing in size and density prior to egg-laying. However, endolymphatic sacs may also be required for assistance with periods of rapid bone growth.

The main island of New Caledonia with adjacent islands

== Distribution ==
Species within the Eurydactylodes genus are endemic to New Caledonia along with few adjacent islands theorised to be due to Diplodactylinae dispersion from Southeast Asia through the Indo-Australian islands. E. symmetricus is located in the southern part of Grande Terre with a northernmost location of Pic Ningua. E. symmetricus is allopatric with E. occidentalis yet sympatric with E. vieillardi. E. occidentalis is present in Province Sud and distributed in the central west coast of Grande Terre between Poya and Bourail. E. agricolae is parapatric with E. vieillardi and dispersed amongst Province Nord within Northern Grande Terre and also on the Iles Belep and Ile Yandé. E. vieillardi is widespread on Grande Terre south of the Koniambo and Tchingou massifs and also located from Ile des Pins.

== Evolution ==
The Diplodactylidae family with which Eurydactylodes resides is postulated to have evolved from a primitive gekkonid radiation located in south-east Asian tropics within the upper Cretaceous. Dispersion of this ancestral stock occurred toward Australia through the Indo-Australian Archipelago. Within this family, the Carphodactylini tribe containing Eurydactylodes are characterised as more primitive due to presence of numerous preanal pores concentrated into a large patch as well as a large nasal process and arboreal lifestyle. The extensive differences between the opposing Diplodactylini tribe indicate Carphodactylini differentiation occurring as early as Palaeocene-Eocene time. Genera present within the New Caledonia-Loyalty Islands radiation as a result of evolutionary migration include Eurydactylodes, Rhacodactylus, and likely Bavayia. Eurydactylodes are convergent with Australian diplodactylid genus Strophurus, twig anoles and other gekkonids according to traits involving crypsis, defense, and reproduction.

== History ==
French herpetologist Arthur René Jean Baptiste Bavay described the species E. vieillardi under the name of Platydactylus vieillardi in his first catalogue of reptiles in New Caledonia titled Catalogue des reptiles de la Nouvelle-Caledonia et description dupuces nouvelle during 1869. The genus Eurydactylus was named by Henri Émile Sauvage to accommodate the new specimen described by Bavay. Swedish herpetologist Lars Gabriel Andersson described a second species associated with the Eurydactylus genus named E. symmetricus in the article Two new Lizards (Eurydactylus and Lygosoma) from New Caledonia according to a single specimen and without specific locality data. The systematic placement of the genus was previously unknown until the efforts of Garth Leon Underwood who allocated the genus into the Gekkoninae according available literature in 1954. Underwood then proceeded to transfer the genus to the Diplodactylinae as justified by several characteristics in 1955 which has since been accepted by all following authors. In 1965, Heinz Fritz Wermuth altered the genus name to Eurydactylodes upon discovering that Andersson's name was a homonym for Eurydactylus LaFerté-Sénectère – an insect and member of Carabidae. Recently, German herpetologist Wolfgang Böhme and Friedrich Wilhelm Henkel described a third species E. agricolae in 2001 and suggested that further species may be discovered under the genus. D. Han reevaluated the higher order relationships of gekkotans and hence reallocated Eurydactylodes to the Family Diplodactylidae in 2004. An additional species E. occidentalis was also described by American herpetologists Aaron Matthew Bauer and Todd R Jackman as well as Ross Allen Sadlier and Anthony Hume Whitaker in 2009.

== Threats ==
Eurydactylodes species range from CR (critically endangered) to NT (Near threatened) referring to the IUCN red list of threatened species. The following threats are common causations for the decreasing population trend of all species within the Eurydactylodes genus:

=== Habitat loss and deforestation ===
Eurydactylodes habitat loss is worsened through urban development and natural disasters. Expansion of massif nickel mining in Poum, Dôme de Tiébaghi, Kaala and Taom are resulting in the destruction of Maquis vegetation. Livestock and wild ungulates such as deer and pigs as well as cattle at Rivière Nehoué are resultant in agricultural deforestation. Wood and pulp plantations and also non-timber crops require cleared land to be farmed. Wildfires occur throughout the dry forest environment along the western coast of New Caledonia and in adjacent islands. Southern New Caledonia is subject to the threat of indigenous forestation being transformed into exotic forestry. Tourism development at Gouara-Déva requires land for development causing further habitat loss.

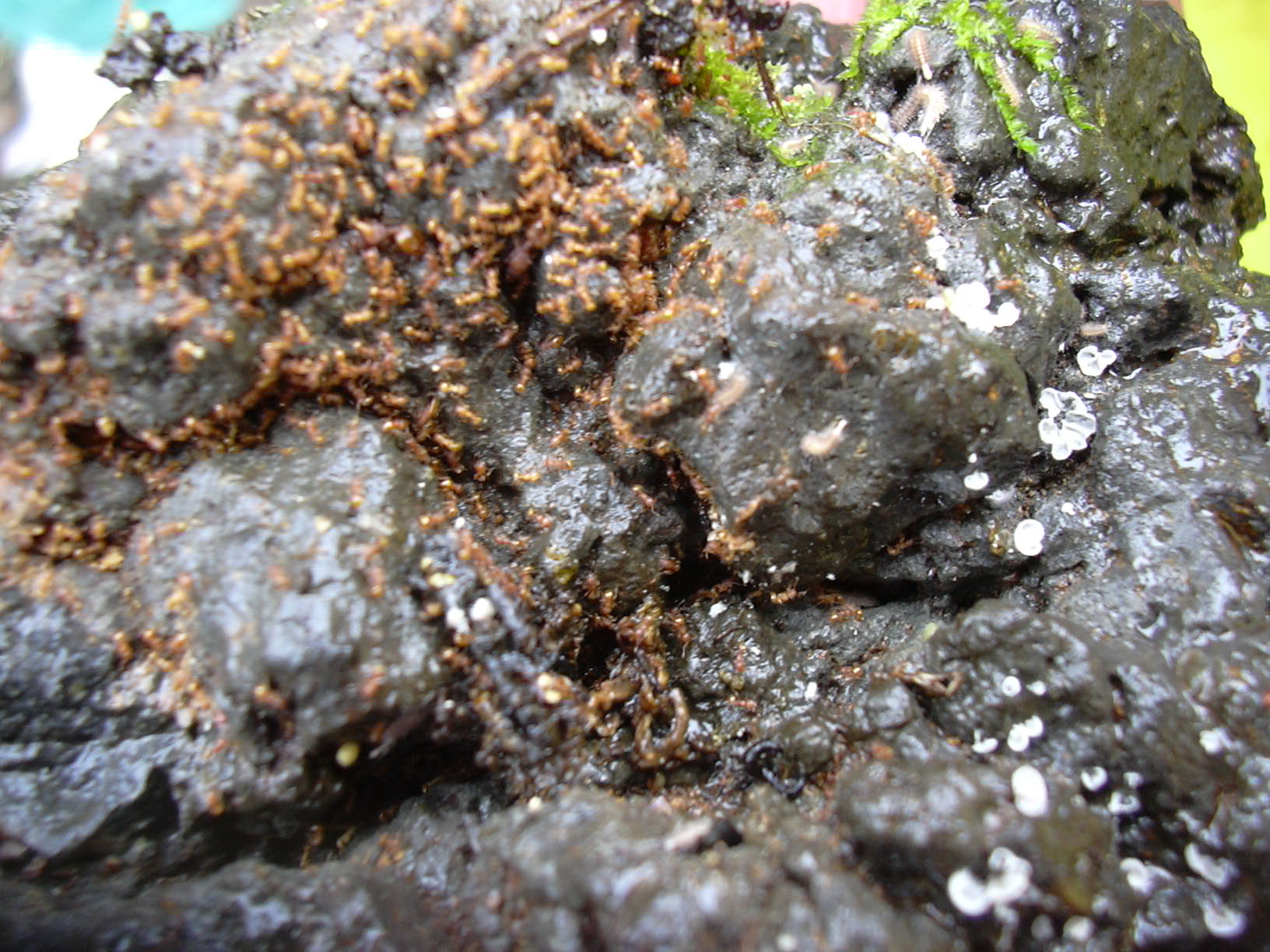
Invasive species Wasmannia auropunctata (Forest & Kim Starr, 2003)

=== Invasive species ===
Predation by introduced species along the sclerophyll remnants of the western coast of New Caledonia including rodents and feral cats are harmful to Eurydactylodes geckos. Lower- elevation forests are abundant in the invasive ant Wasmannia auropumctata which are speculated to have a damaging effect on Eurydactylodes populations.

=== Pet trade ===
The resemblance of Eurydactylodes geckos to chameleons as well as its diurnal activity makes them a suitable pet for many. Thus, these geckos have been in the international pet trade since at least 2017 as well as a potential target for illegal collection and trafficking. Eurydactylodes specimens have appeared on the market in Europe for 1000 Euro in 2019, and prices have reached up to US$2300 for pairs.

== Conservation ==
All species under the Eurydactylodes genus are protected in Province Nord under Code de l'environnement de la Province Nord (Délibération No. 306-2008/APN, 24 October 2008) as well as in Province Sud under Code de l'environnement de la Province Sud (Délibération No. 25-2009/APS, 20 March 2009). The geckos are present in many reserves throughout southern New Caledonia, including Pic Ningua, Pic du Grand Kaori and Forêt Nord as well as Parc Provincial de la Rivière Bleue. No other conservation effort is enacted to preserve Eurydactylodes geckos in New Caledonia. It has been suggested that management of protected areas be undertaken urgently including surveys monitoring Eurydactylodes population size and trends, habitat loss and invasive fire ants.
