= Uvidicolus =

Conservation status
- Least Concern (IUCN 3.1)

Scientific classification
- Kingdom: Animalia
- Phylum: Chordata
- Class: Reptilia
- Order: Squamata
- Suborder: Gekkota
- Family: Carphodactylidae
- Genus: Uvidicolus; P. Oliver & Bauer, 2011
- Species: U. sphyrurus

Binomial name
- Uvidicolus sphyrurus (Ogilby, 1892)

Synonyms
- Gymnodactylus sphyrurus Ogilby 1892; Heteronota walshi Kinghorn, 1931; Phyllurus walshi — Kluge, 1963; Phyllurus sphyrurus — Kluge, 1965; Heteronotia walshi — Wermuth, 1965; Underwoodisaurus sphyrurus — Ingram & Covacevich, 1981; Nephrurus sphyrurus — Bauer 1990; Uvidicolus sphyrurus — P. Oliver & Bauer, 2011

Genus of lizards

Uvidicolus is a monotypic genus of lizard in the family Carphodactylidae. The genus contains the sole species Uvidicolus sphyrurus, also known commonly as the border thick-tailed gecko. The species is endemic to Australia.

== Geographic range ==
U. sphyrurus is found in rocky highlands of the Murray-Darling Basin, in New South Wales and southern Queensland, Australia.

== Habitat ==
The preferred natural habitats of U. sphyrurus are forest, savanna, and rocky areas, at altitudes of 500–1,200 m (1,600–3,900 ft).

== Description ==
U. sphyrurus may attain a snout-to-vent length (SVL) of 7 cm (2.8 in).

== Reproduction ==
U. sphyrurus is oviparous.

== Taxonomy ==
Uvidicolus sphyrurus is sometimes placed in the genus Underwoodisaurus.
