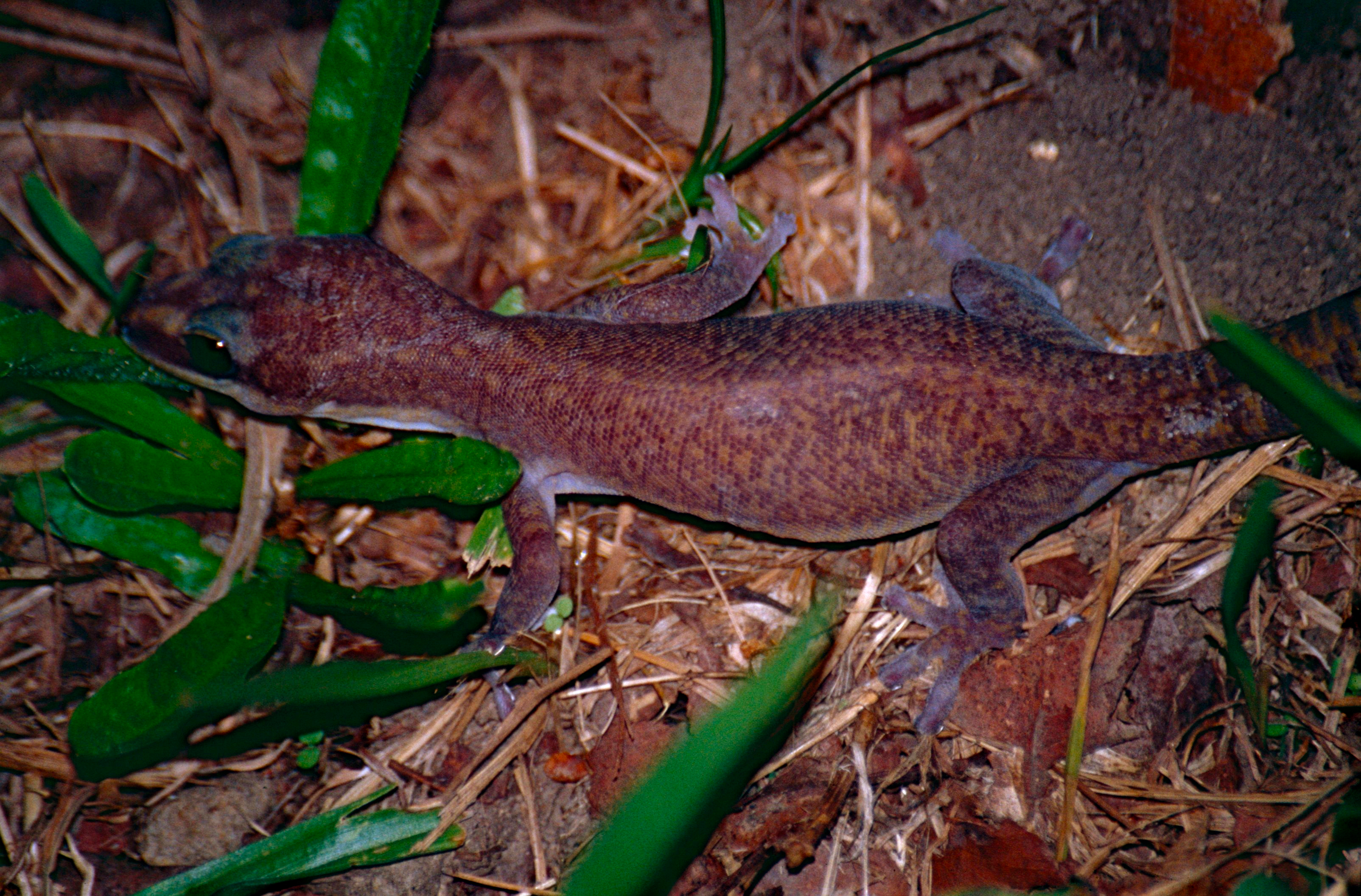
- Ocellated velvet gecko (Oedura monilis)

Scientific classification
- Kingdom: Animalia
- Phylum: Chordata
- Class: Reptilia
- Order: Squamata
- Suborder: Gekkota
- Family: Diplodactylidae
- Genus: Oedura; J. E. Gray, 1842

= Oedura =

Genus of lizards

Oedura is a genus of medium to large geckos, lizards in the family Diplodactylidae. The genus is endemic to Australia. Species in the genus are referred to by the common name velvet geckos.

== Geographic range ==
Most of the species of Oedura occur in northern and eastern Australia, with further isolates in the arid zone (Pilbara, Central Ranges and Flinders Ranges).

== Behaviour and habitat ==
Geckos of the genus Oedura are mostly arboreal and nocturnal, and have flattened bodies that are distinctly patterned. They are secretive tree or rock dwellers, usually concealing themselves beneath peeling bark or in cracks and crevices. A species found in the Kimberley region, Oedura filicipoda, is named for the plumose fringing on the toes that may assist in clinging to rocky overhangs. All species are adapted to their dry conditions and can go for months without food or water.

== Taxonomy ==
The content of the genus Oedura has been reduced by Oliver et al. in 2012, when they transferred four species to the genus Amalosia and erected two new monotypic genera, Hesperoedura for Oedura reticulata and Nebulifera for Oedura robusta.

== Species ==
Southern Spotted Velvet Gecko (Oedura tryoni)

The type species for the genus is Oedura marmorata, first described by John Edward Gray in 1842. The following is a list of the 19 valid species:

- Oedura argentea Hoskin, Zozaya & Vanderduys, 2018 – silver-eyed velvet gecko
- Oedura bella Oliver & Doughty, 2016 – gulf marbled velvet gecko
- Oedura castelnaui (Thominot, 1889) – northern velvet gecko
- Oedura cincta De Vis, 1888 – inland marbled velvet gecko
- Oedura coggeri Bustard, 1966 – northern spotted velvet gecko
- Oedura elegans Hoskin, 2019 – elegant velvet gecko
- Oedura filicipoda King, 1985 – fringe-toed velvet gecko
- Oedura fimbria Oliver & Doughty, 2016 – western marbled velvet gecko
- Oedura gemmata King & Gow, 1983 – jewelled velvet gecko
- Oedura gracilis King, 1985 – gracile velvet gecko
- Oedura jowalbinna Hoskin & Higgie, 2008 – Quinkan velvet gecko
- Oedura lineata Hoskin, 2019 – Arcadia velvet gecko
- Oedura luritja Oliver & McDonald, 2016 – Mereenie velvet gecko
- Oedura marmorata Gray, 1842 – marbled velvet gecko
- Oedura monilis De Vis, 1888 – ocellated velvet gecko
- Oedura murrumanu Oliver, Laver, Melville & Doughty, 2014 – limestone range velvet gecko
- Oedura nesos Oliver, Jolly, Skipwith, Tedeschi & Gillespie, 2020
- Oedura picta Hoskin, 2019 – ornate velvet gecko
- Oedura tryoni De Vis, 1884 – southern spotted velvet gecko

Nota bene: A binomial authority in parentheses indicates that the species was originally described in a genus other than Oedura.

== Species formerly in Oedura ==
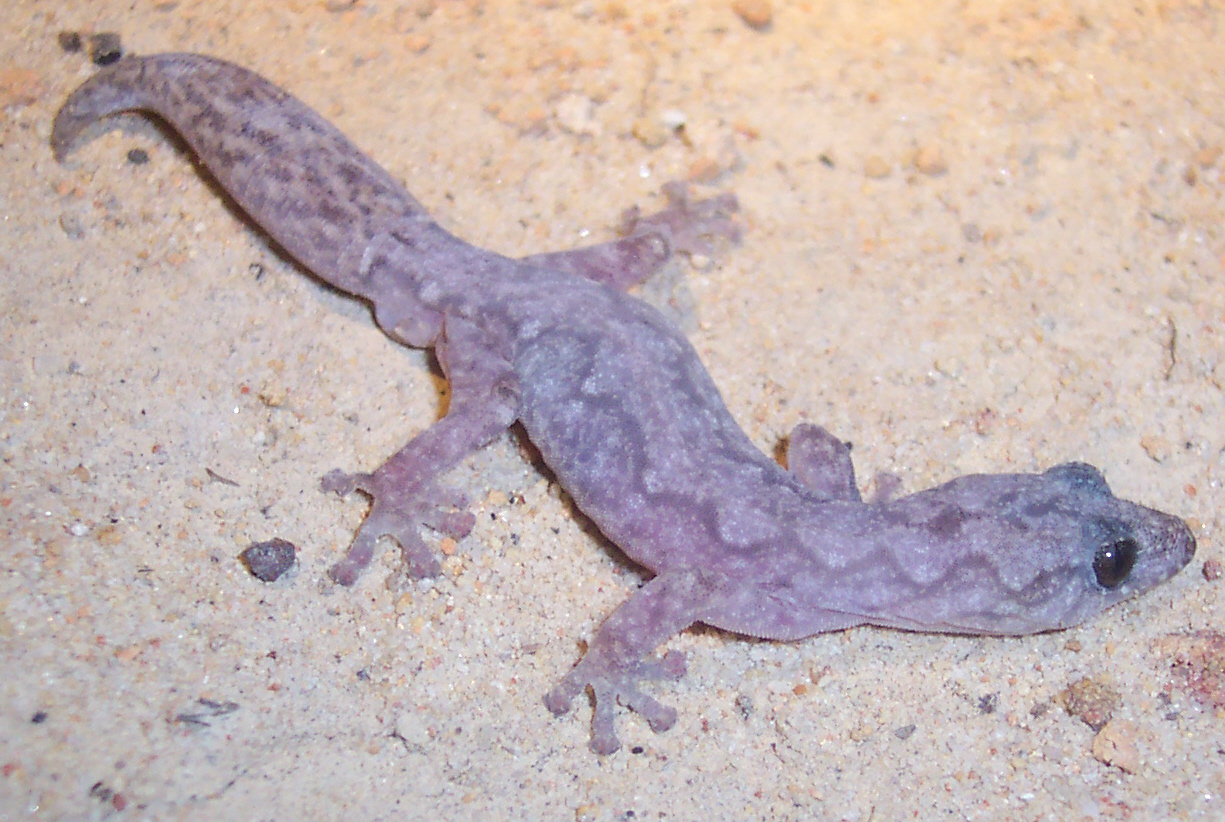
Oedura lesueurii now belongs to the genus Amalosia

Transferred to genus Amalosia Wells & Wellington, 1983:

- Oedura jacovae – valid as Amalosia jacovae (Couper, Keim & Hoskin, 2007)
- Oedura lesueurii – Lesueur's velvet gecko, valid as Amalosia lesueurii (A.M.C. Duméril & Bibron, 1836)
- Oedura obscura – slim velvet gecko, valid as Amalosia obscura (King, 1985)
- Oedura rhombifer – zigzag velvet gecko, valid as Amalosia rhombifer (Gray, 1845)

Transferred to genus Hesperoedura Oliver et al., 2012:

- Oedura reticulata – reticulated velvet gecko, valid as Hesperoedura reticulata (Bustard, 1969)

Transferred to genus Nebulifera Oliver et al., 2012:

- Oedura robusta – robust velvet gecko, valid as Nebulifera robusta (Boulenger, 1885)
