= Crocosaurus Cove =

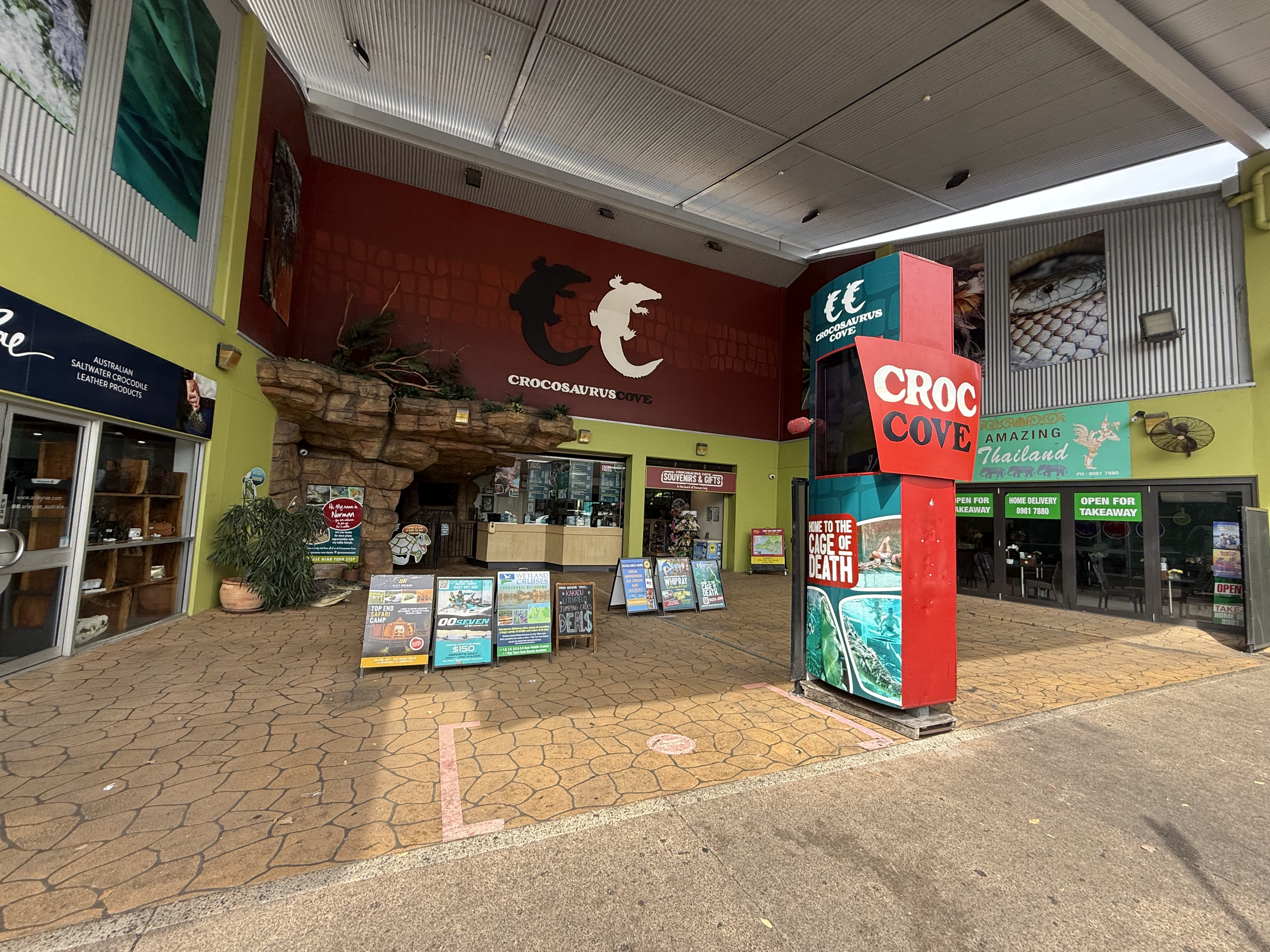
- Crocosaurus Cove, October 2025
- Interactive map of Crocosaurus Cove
- 12°27′44″S 130°50′21″E
- Date opened: 2008
- Location: Mitchell Street, Darwin, Northern Territory, Australia
- Land area: 1.15 acres (0.47 ha)
- No. of species: 70+
- Owner: Mick Burns
- Website: www.crocosauruscove.com

Crocosaurus Cove is a crocodile (and other reptile) herpetarium and aquarium attraction located in an indoor-outdoor complex in the city district of Darwin, Northern Territory, Australia. Its main focus, as the facility's name indicates, is the crocodile, a common animal in northern Australia.

The park says it has "the World's largest display of Australian reptiles", and most of its reptiles are from the Top End of the Northern Territory and the Kimberley and desert regions of Australia. Other than crocodiles, the attraction features many other reptiles, including venomous snakes like the king brown and inland taipan, and a large number of Australian pythons. It is the only public facility in the world that features the extremely rare Oenpelli python – the longest snake found in the Northern Territory.

It also has a 200,000-litre freshwater aquarium with freshwater whiprays, barramundi, turtles, and various other Australian fauna.

The owner, Mick Burns, is also the owner of Darwin Crocodile Farm.

== Crocodiles ==
The facility has a considerable number of saltwater crocodiles, including the 700-kg and 5.1-metre-long male Burt, who appeared in 1986 movie Crocodile Dundee and made news in 2018 for 'psychic predictions' outcomes of the 2018 Soccer World Cup by reaching up and grabbing photographs of players, which was seen as match and player performance 'predicting'. The facility has also had success with breeding and hatching baby crocodiles, including in July 2022 with baby crocodiles hatched to parent crocodiles female Kate and male William. One of the things most well known at the facility which has especially attracted visitors is a 'cage of death' experience where paying visitors can swim in water with large crocodiles while protected from physical contact with them by being enclosed behind a glass safety dome.

On 23 December 2024, Crocosaurus Cove announced the death of Burt. He was estimated to be 90 years old.

== Species kept ==
Species kept and displayed at the facility are listed below.

=== Reptiles ===
==== Crocodiles ====
- Freshwater crocodile
- Saltwater crocodile

==== Lizards ====
- Black-headed monitor
- Centralian blue-tongued skink
- Centralian knob-tailed gecko
- Centralian tree-dragon
- Frilled lizard
- Fringe-toed velvet gecko
- Giant cave gecko
- Hosmer's skink
- Inland bearded-dragon
- Jewelled velvet-gecko
- Lace monitor
- Leopard skink
- Long-nosed water dragon
- Marbled velvet gecko
- Merten's water monitor
- Northern blue-tongued skink
- Northern spiny-tailed gecko
- Perentie
- Pygmy mulga monitor
- Rusty monitor
- Sand goanna
- Spencer's monitor
- Spiny-tailed monitor
- Stokes's skink
- Storr's monitor
- Western blue-tongued skink
- Yellow-throated monitor

==== Snakes ====
- Black-headed python
- Bredl's carpet python
- Children's python
- Coastal taipan
- Eastern brown snake
- Inland taipan
- King brown snake
- Northern carpet python
- Northern death adder
- Oenpelli python
- Olive python
- Pygmy mulga snake
- Rough-scaled python
- Slaty-grey snake
- Stimson's python
- Water python
- Western brown snake
- Woma python

==== Turtles ====
- Arnhem Land long-necked turtle
- Northern long-necked turtle
- Northern red-faced turtle
- Northern snapping turtle
- Northern yellow-faced turtle
- Pig-nosed turtle
- Victoria River turtle

=== Amphibians ===
- Cane toad
- Green tree frog
- Magnificent tree frog

=== Fish ===
- Banded rainbowfish
- Barramundi
- Black catfish
- Blackmast
- Butler's grunter
- Chequered rainbowfish
- Common archerfish
- Fly-specked hardyhead
- Freshwater sawfish
- Freshwater whipray
- Gulf saratoga
- Indo-Pacific tarpon
- Mangrove jack
- Silver cobbler
- Sooty grunter
- Spotted scat

== Gallery ==
Photo gallery
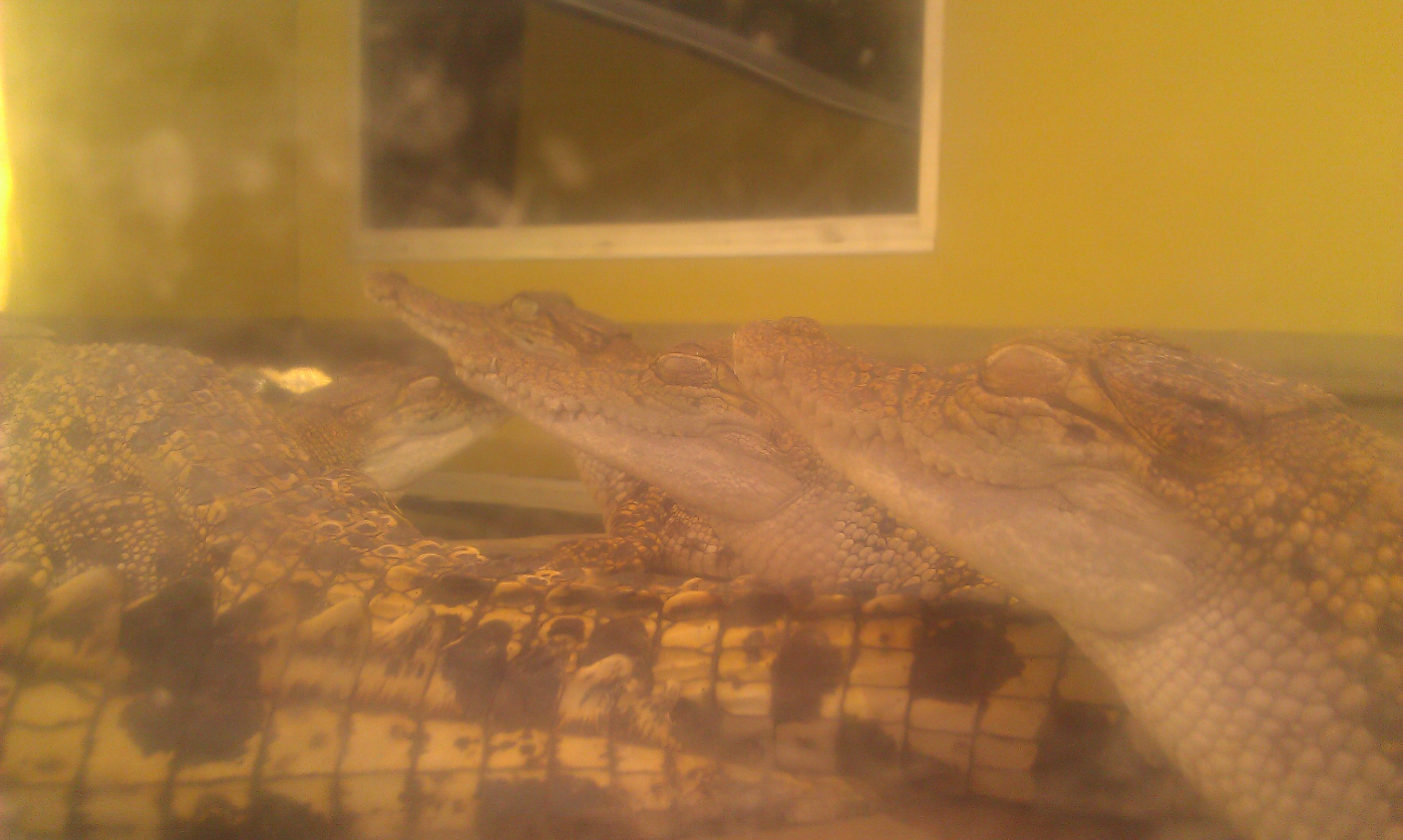
Infant saltwater crocodiles on display

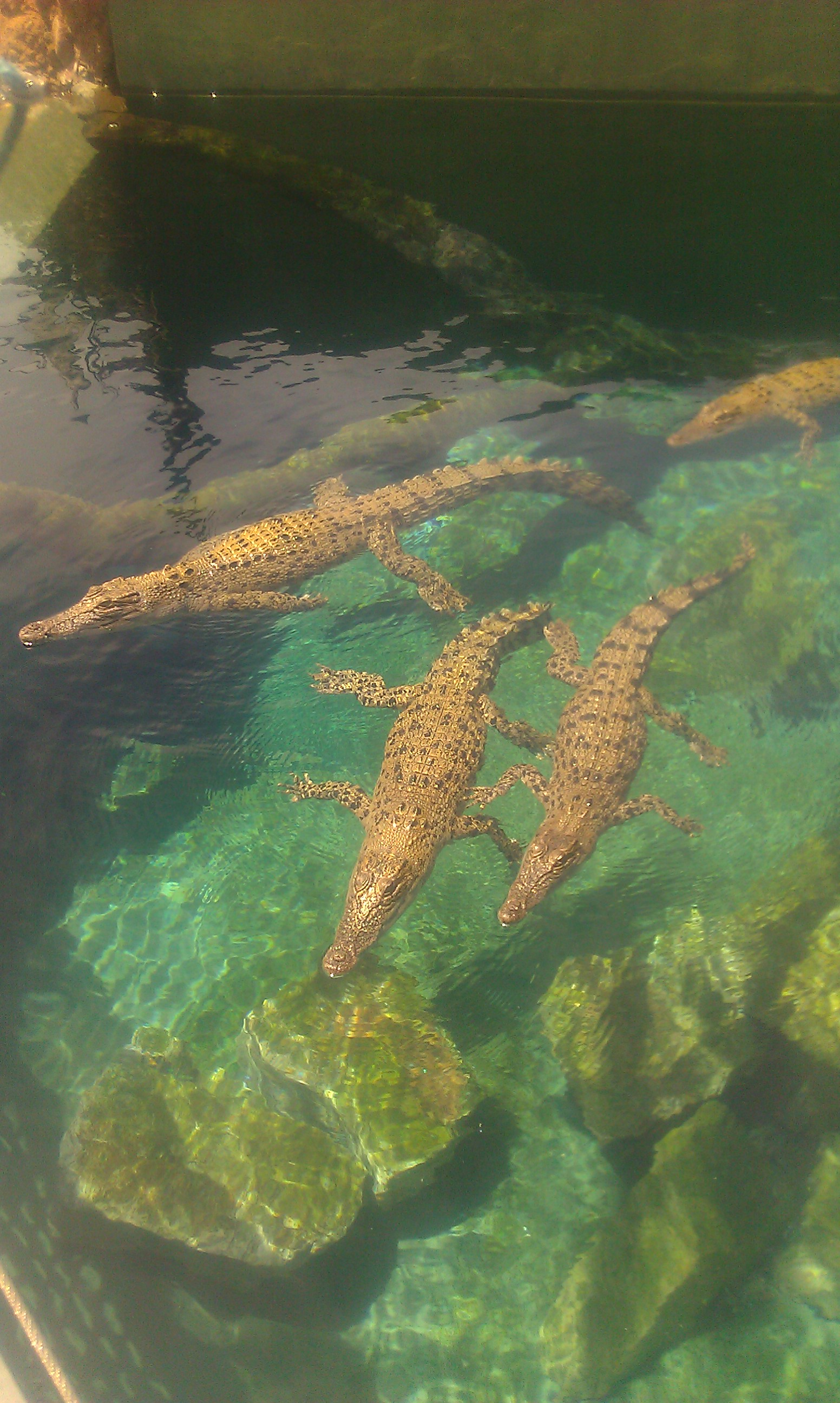
Saltwater crocodiles on display

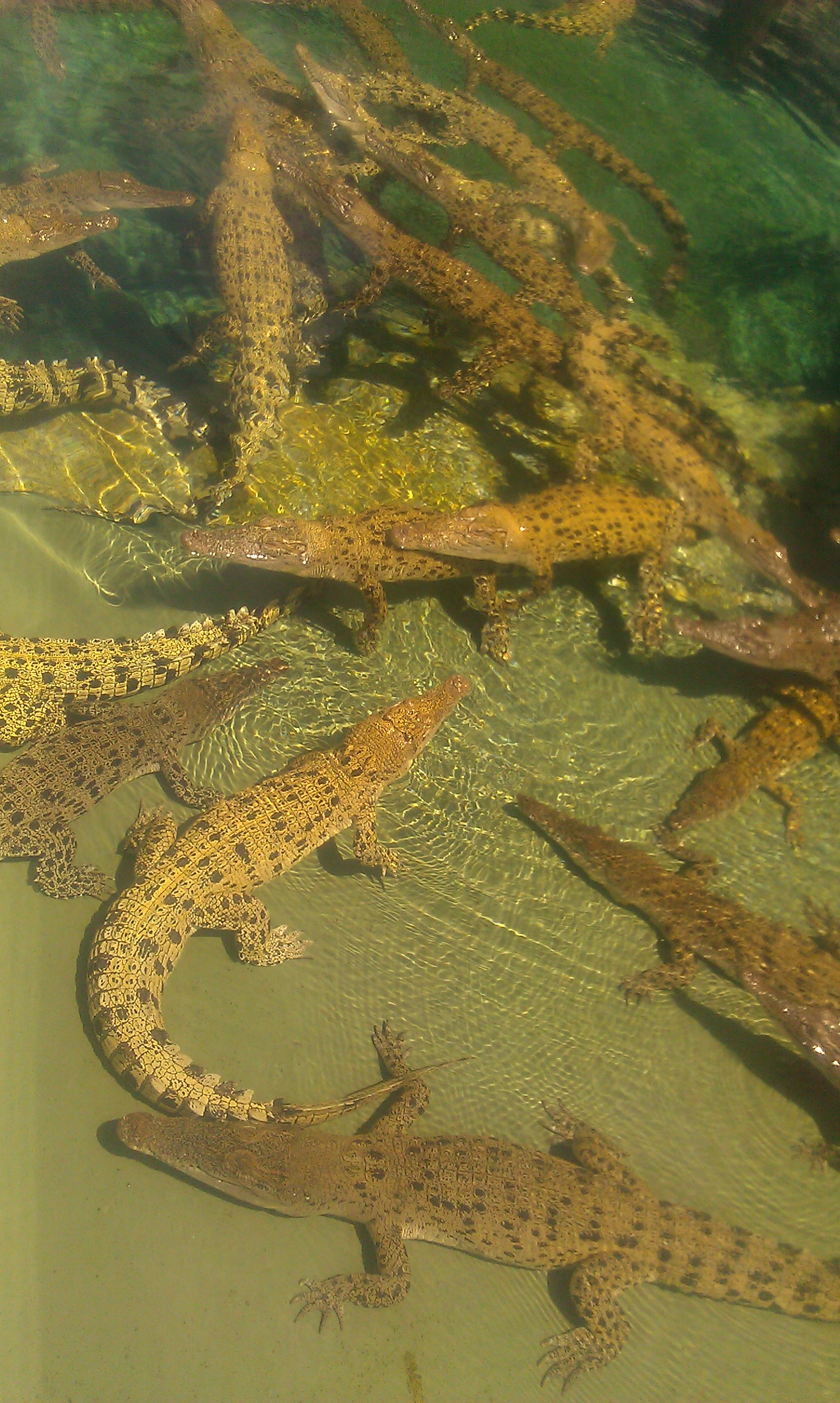
Saltwater crocodiles on display

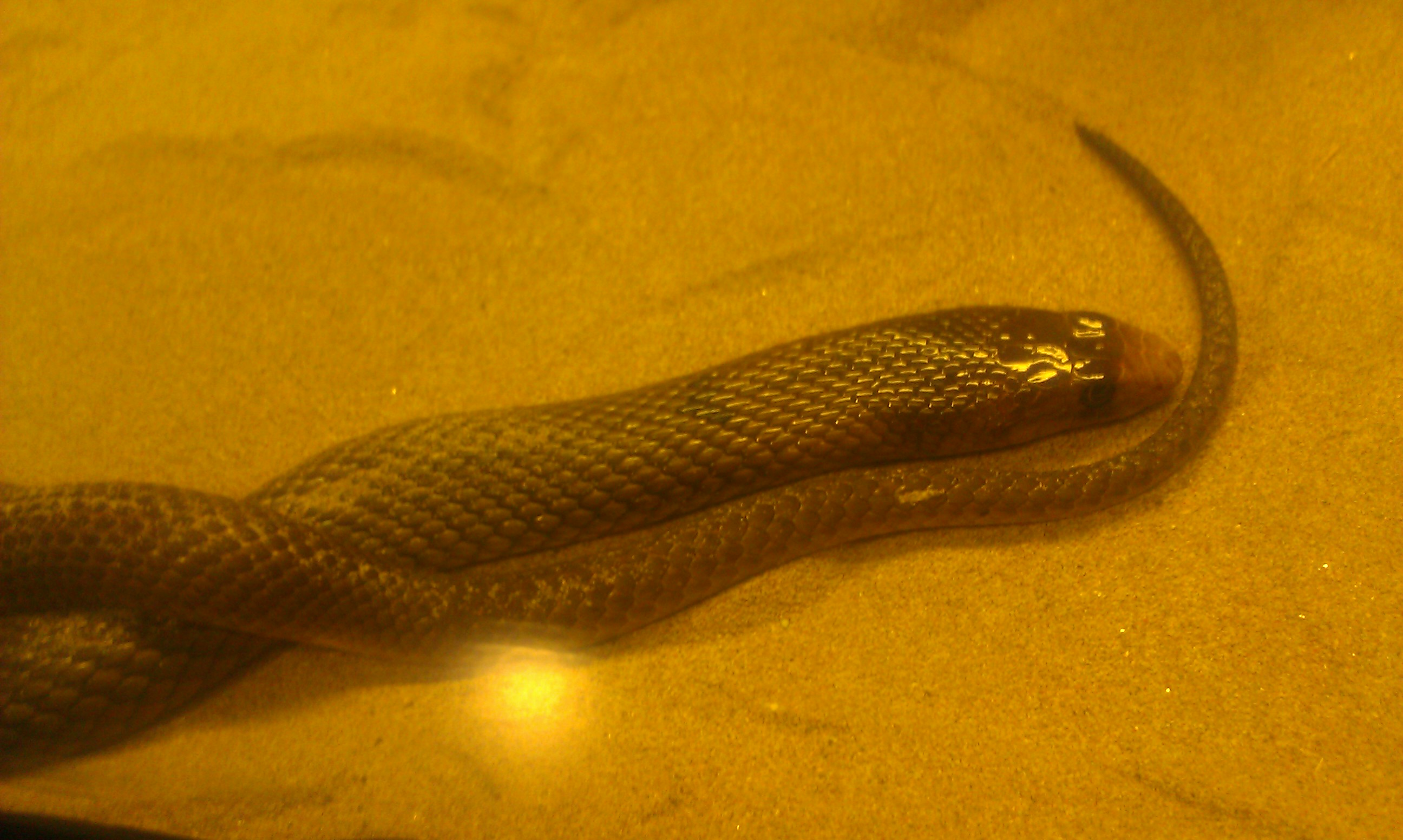
Western brown snake on display

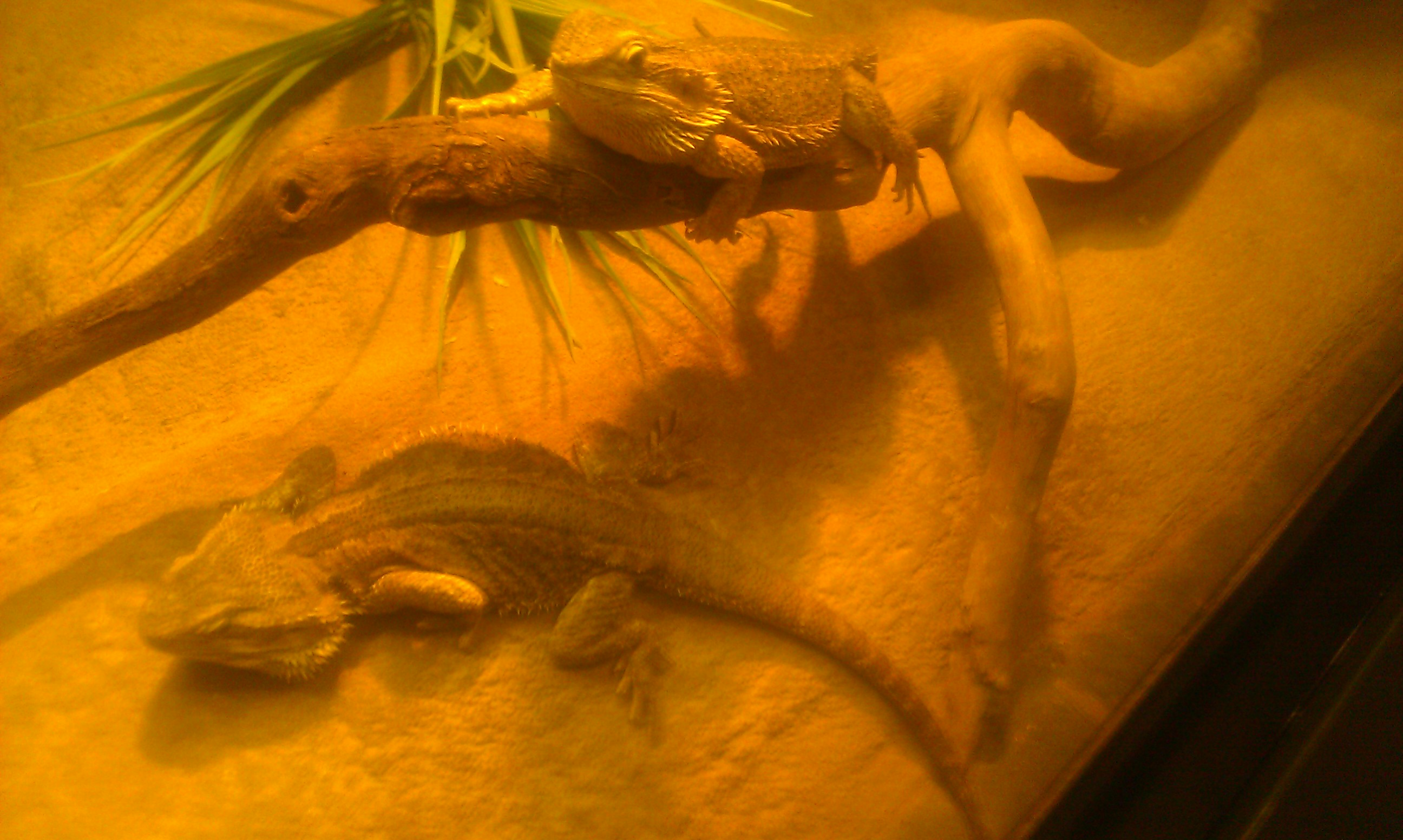
Inland bearded dragons on display

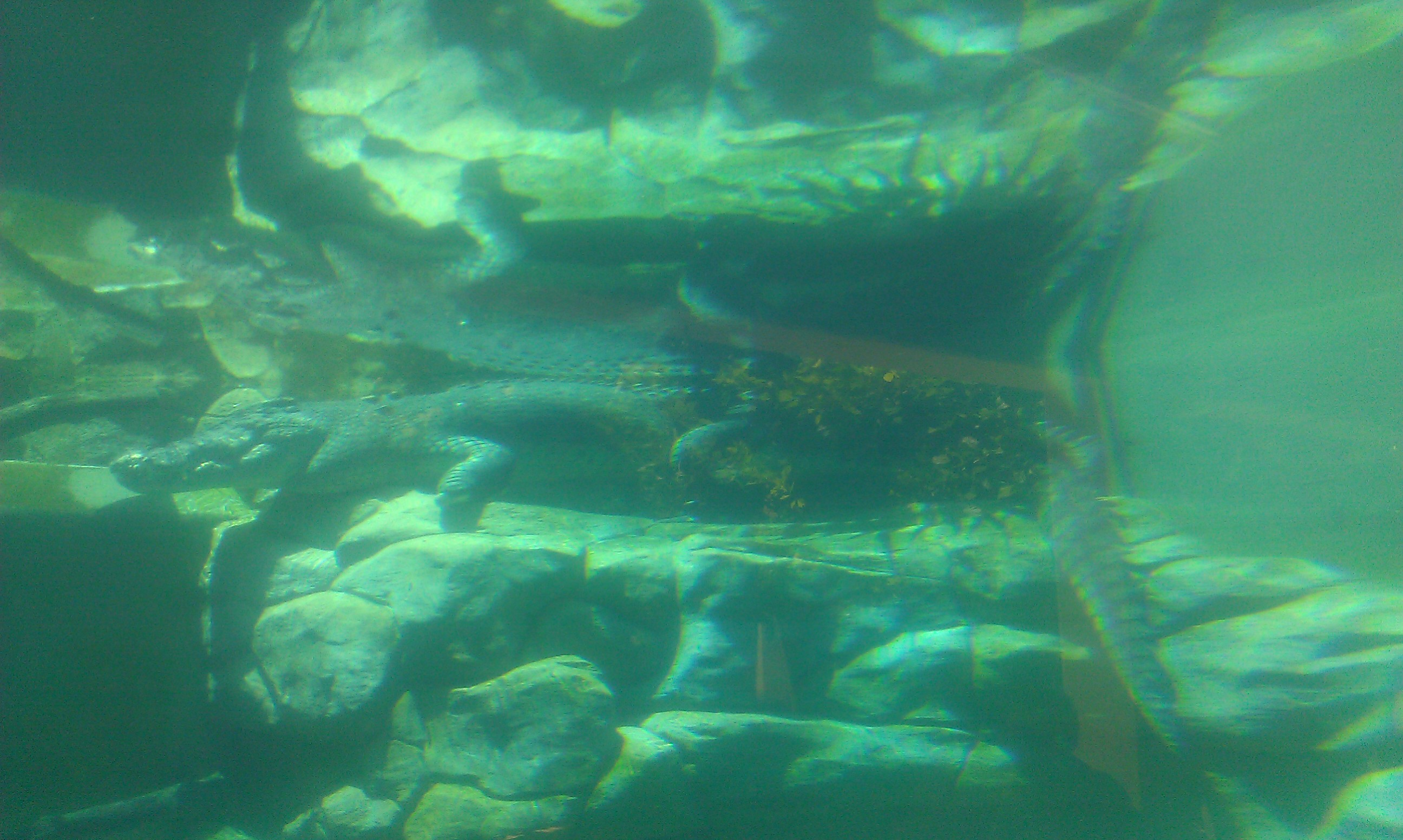
A large saltwater crocodile seen through under-water viewing glass at Crocosaurus Cove
