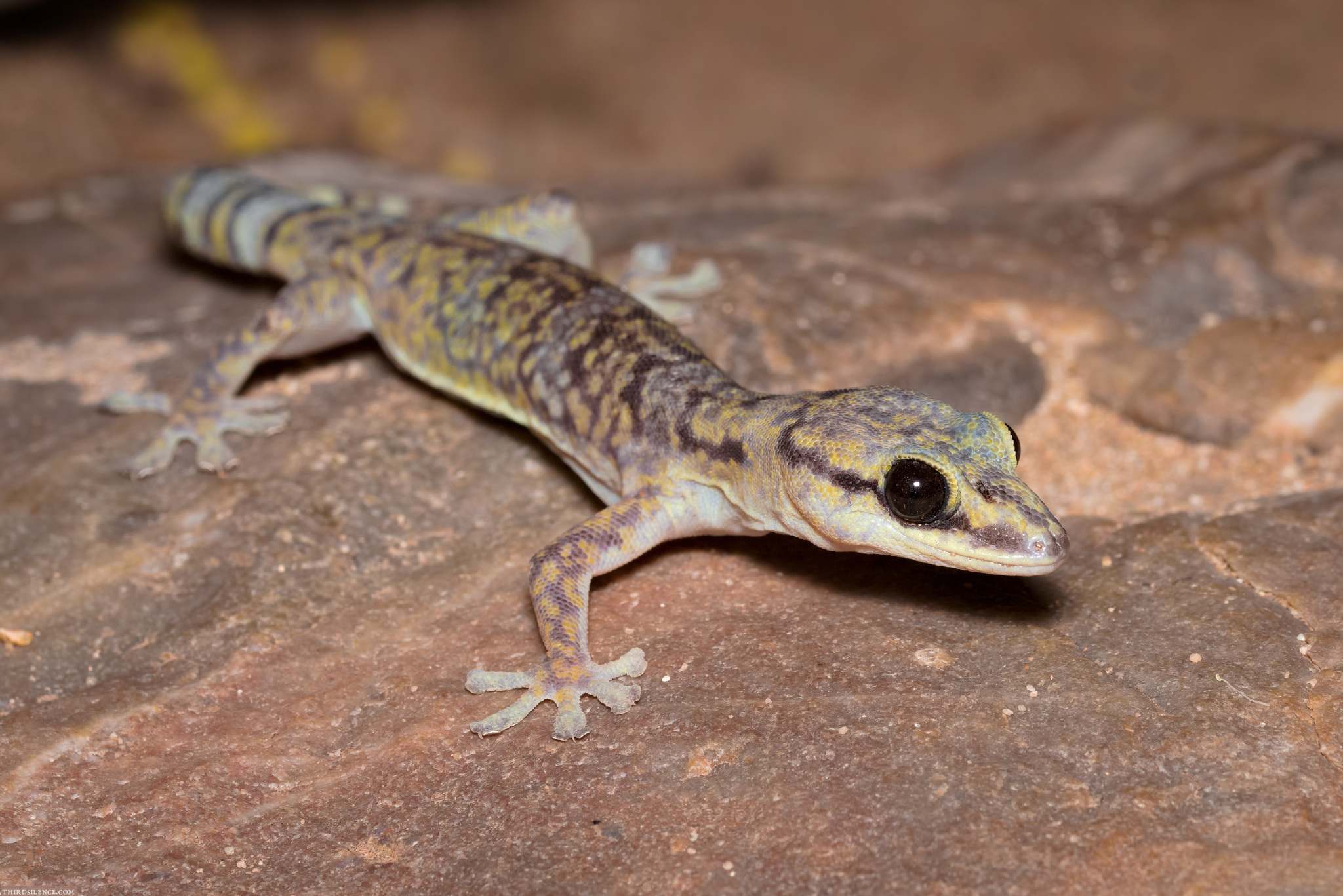

Conservation status
- Least Concern (IUCN 3.1)

Scientific classification
- Kingdom: Animalia
- Phylum: Chordata
- Class: Reptilia
- Order: Squamata
- Suborder: Gekkota
- Family: Diplodactylidae
- Genus: Oedura
- Species: O. cincta

Binomial name
- Oedura cincta (de Vis, 1888)
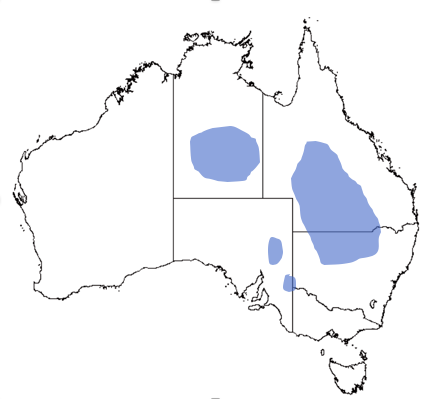
- Estimated Distribution of Oedura cincta in Australia, shown in blue

= Oedura cincta =

Species of lizard

Oedura cincta, or inland marbled velvet gecko, is an Australian species of gecko.

== Description ==
The inland marbled velvet gecko measures with a snout-vent length an average of 90mm but up to 108mm, with a thick tail and five or six light bands across the body over a purplish brown background. These bands are especially evident in juveniles. Light yellow flecking appears as they mature into adults, making the banding less distinct. The tail may become thinner in times of stress and lowered body condition. The base colour of purple brown appears in adults during the day, with a more dull grey appearance at night. They can be distinguished from the morphologically similar O. marmorata by a longer body length and a longer and slimmer tail which is never thicker than the head.

== Etymology ==
Cinctus is the Latin singular masculine form of cingo, which means to go around, surround or encompass. This is likely in relation to the bands present on the tail of the Oedura cincta. Oedura means swollen tail, in reference to the significantly enlarged tail common to most Oedura spp..

== Taxonomy and evolution ==
Divergence of Oedura cincta from other species occurred in the plio-pleistocene for isolated populations, and early pliocene for central populations. The species was recently brought out of synonymy by Oliver and Doughty (2016) from Oedura marmorata, a close relative, from which four distinct species have now been detailed; O. cincta, O. fimbria, O. bella and the originally described O. marmorata. As saxicoline (rock-dwelling) lizards, singular species such as O. cinta can encompass multiple distinct lineages as their habitats differ and can be considered two evolutionary significant units (ESUs). In the case of O. cincta, this species encompasses both the eastern and central lineages. O. derelicta is considered a synonym of O.cincta in junior form.

== Distribution and habitat ==
Oedura cincta have been found to have a wide distribution in central Australia and inland eastern Australia. Oedura cincta are tree and rock dwelling geckos found to inhabit mostly granite, quartz, sandstone and limestone rocks as well as trees. The eastern ESU (evolutionary significant units) have been found to inhabit western New South Wales and Queensland woodland areas throughout the Cooper and Darling basins, residing mostly in tree hollows and bark of small trees, predominantly Casuarina spp.. They are also known to inhabit rocks when available and have been found in this habitat in the Flinders Ranges. Proportionately more arboreal (tree-dwelling) O. cincta are found throughout inland eastern Australia (eastern ESU) while the rock dwelling lineages are less widely distributed and found mostly in central Australia (central ESU). Two isolated populations of the central ESU have been identified in the South of the Northern Territory in the Macdonell and Reynolds Ranges foraging, and these have been predominantly rock-dwelling.

== Reproduction ==
Oedura cincta are oviparous, meaning they lay eggs rather than give birth to live young, and are thought to have a clutch size that averages two young.

== Diet ==
Oedura spp. forage for arthropods over vertical surfaces such as rocks and trees as well as on the ground. Oedura spp. have also been seen lapping sap from trees, usually wattles.
