= Velvet gecko =

Velvet gecko can refer to any of the following gecko genera. Some genera are endemic to Australia, while others are endemic to Madagascar. :

- Family Diplodactylidae
- Amalosia
- Robust velvet gecko, Nebulifera robusta
- Oedura
- Reticulated velvet gecko, Hesperoedura reticulata
- Family Gekkonidae
- Homopholis
- Blaesodactylus
