= Mereenie =

Mereenie may refer to:

- Mereenie, Northern Territory, a locality in Australia
- Mereenie velvet gecko, a species of gecko endemic to the Northern Territory of Australia
