= Oedura argentea =

Conservation status
- Least Concern (IUCN 3.1)

Scientific classification
- Kingdom: Animalia
- Phylum: Chordata
- Class: Reptilia
- Order: Squamata
- Suborder: Gekkota
- Family: Diplodactylidae
- Genus: Oedura
- Species: O. argentea

Binomial name
- Oedura argentea Hoskin, Zozaya & Vanderduys, 2018

Species of lizard

Oedura argentea (also the silver-eyed velvet gecko) is a species of velvet gecko (Diplodactylidae: Oedura) that has been recently described from the sandstone ranges of central-north Queensland, Australia.
