= Oedura elegans =

Conservation status
- Least Concern (IUCN 3.1)

Scientific classification
- Kingdom: Animalia
- Phylum: Chordata
- Class: Reptilia
- Order: Squamata
- Suborder: Gekkota
- Family: Diplodactylidae
- Genus: Oedura
- Species: O. elegans

Binomial name
- Oedura elegans Hoskin, 2019

Species of lizard

Oedura elegans, the elegant velvet gecko, is a species of gecko endemic to Queensland and New South Wales in Australia. It, along with two other species (Oedura lineata and Oedura picta), was first formally named in 2019.
