= Quinkan velvet gecko =

Conservation status
- Near Threatened (IUCN 3.1)

Scientific classification
- Kingdom: Animalia
- Phylum: Chordata
- Class: Reptilia
- Order: Squamata
- Suborder: Gekkota
- Family: Diplodactylidae
- Genus: Oedura
- Species: O. jowalbinna

Binomial name
- Oedura jowalbinna Hoskin & Higgie, 2008

Species of lizard

The Quinkan velvet gecko (Oedura jowalbinna) is a gecko endemic to Australia.
