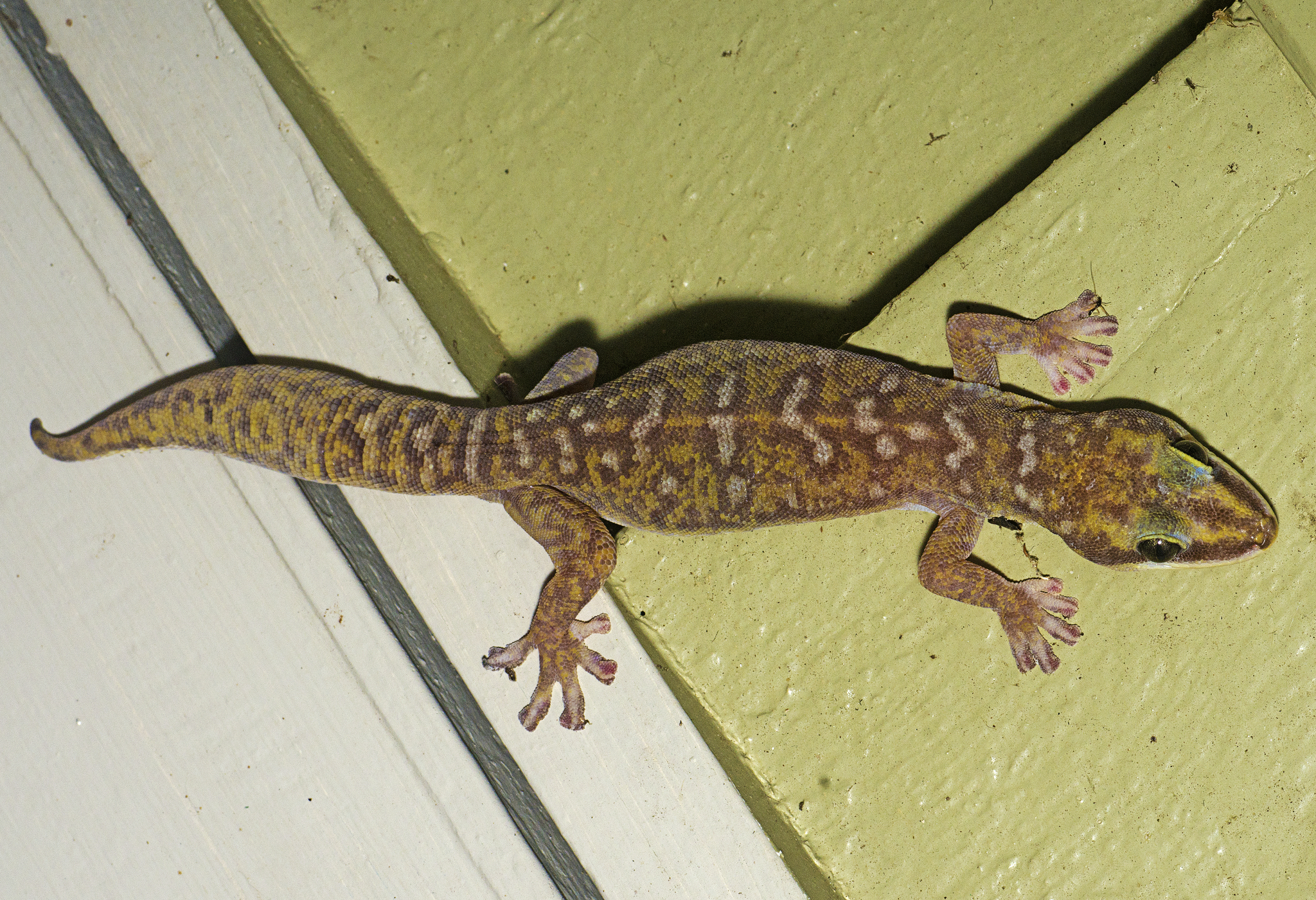

Conservation status
- Least Concern (IUCN 3.1)

Scientific classification
- Kingdom: Animalia
- Phylum: Chordata
- Class: Reptilia
- Order: Squamata
- Suborder: Gekkota
- Family: Diplodactylidae
- Genus: Oedura
- Species: O. tryoni

Binomial name
- Oedura tryoni De Vis, 1884

= Southern spotted velvet gecko =

Species of lizard

The southern spotted velvet gecko (Oedura tryoni), also known commonly as Tryon's velvet gecko, is a species of lizard in the family Diplodactylidae. The species is endemic to Australia.

== Etymology ==
The specific name, tryoni, is in honor of English scientist Henry Tryon (1856–1943).

== Geographic range ==
O. tryoni is found in northeastern New South Wales and southeastern Queensland, Australia.

== Habitat ==
The preferred natural habitats of O. tryoni are forest and rocky areas.

== Reproduction ==
O. tryoni is oviparous.
