= Gracile velvet gecko =

Conservation status
- Least Concern (IUCN 3.1)

Scientific classification
- Kingdom: Animalia
- Phylum: Chordata
- Class: Reptilia
- Order: Squamata
- Suborder: Gekkota
- Family: Diplodactylidae
- Genus: Oedura
- Species: O. gracilis

Binomial name
- Oedura gracilis King, 1985

Species of lizard

The gracile velvet gecko (Oedura gracilis) is a gecko endemic to Western Australia.

== External site ==
Photos https://www.inaturalist.org/taxa/107380-Oedura-gracilis/browse_photos
