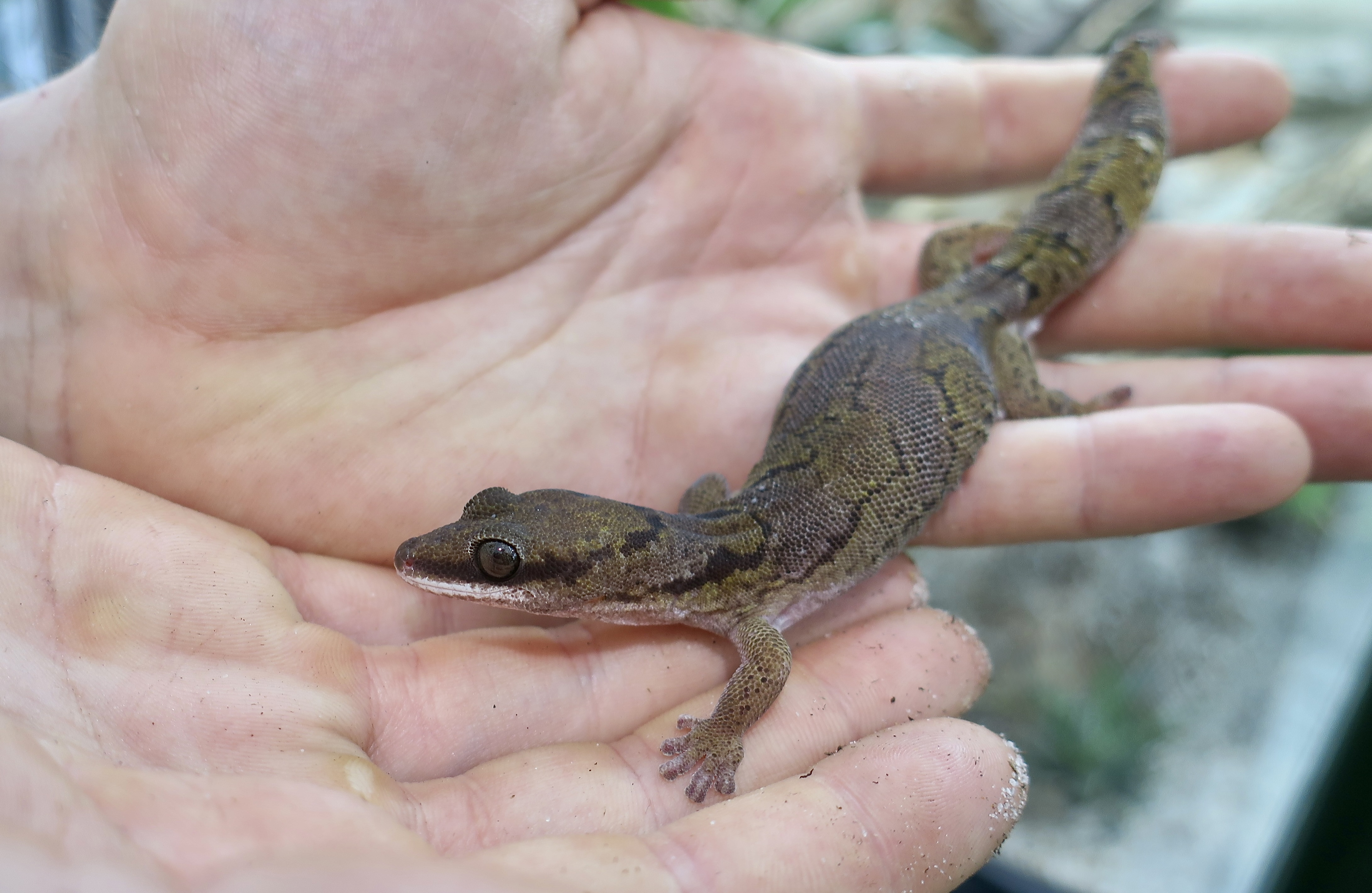

Conservation status
- Least Concern (IUCN 3.1)

Scientific classification
- Kingdom: Animalia
- Phylum: Chordata
- Class: Reptilia
- Order: Squamata
- Suborder: Gekkota
- Family: Diplodactylidae
- Genus: Oedura
- Species: O. castelnaui

Binomial name
- Oedura castelnaui (Thominot, 1889)

Synonyms
- Phyllodactylus castelnaui Thominot, 1889; Oedura castelnaui — Bustard, 1970

= Northern velvet gecko =

Species of lizard

The northern velvet gecko (Oedura castelnaui) is a species of lizard in the family Diplodactylidae. The species is endemic to Queensland in Australia.

== Etymology ==
The specific name, castelnaui, is in honor of French naturalist Francis de Laporte de Castelnau.

== Geographic range ==
O. castelnaui is found on the Cape York Peninsula, Queensland, Australia.

== Habitat ==
The preferred natural habitats of O. castelnaui are forest and savanna.

== Reproduction ==
O. castelnaui is oviparous. Clutch size is two eggs, which have a parchment-like shell, and hatch in 60 days.
