= Oedura picta =

Scientific classification
- Kingdom: Animalia
- Phylum: Chordata
- Class: Reptilia
- Order: Squamata
- Suborder: Gekkota
- Family: Diplodactylidae
- Genus: Oedura
- Species: O. picta

Binomial name
- Oedura picta Hoskin, 2019

Species of lizard

Oedura picta, the ornate velvet gecko, is a species of gecko endemic to Queensland in Australia. It, along with two other species (Oedura elegans and Oedura lineata), was first formally named in 2019.
