= Oedura murrumanu =

Scientific classification
- Kingdom: Animalia
- Phylum: Chordata
- Class: Reptilia
- Order: Squamata
- Suborder: Gekkota
- Family: Diplodactylidae
- Genus: Oedura
- Species: O. murrumanu

Binomial name
- Oedura murrumanu Oliver, Laver, Melville, & Doughty, 2014

Species of lizard

Oedura murrumanu, also called the limestone range velvet gecko, is a gecko endemic to Australia.
