= Oedura nesos =

Scientific classification
- Kingdom: Animalia
- Phylum: Chordata
- Class: Reptilia
- Order: Squamata
- Suborder: Gekkota
- Family: Diplodactylidae
- Genus: Oedura
- Species: O. nesos

Binomial name
- Oedura nesos Oliver, Jolly, Skipwith, Tedeschi, & Gillespie, 2020

Species of lizard

Oedura nesos is a species of gecko endemic to the Northern Territory in Australia.
