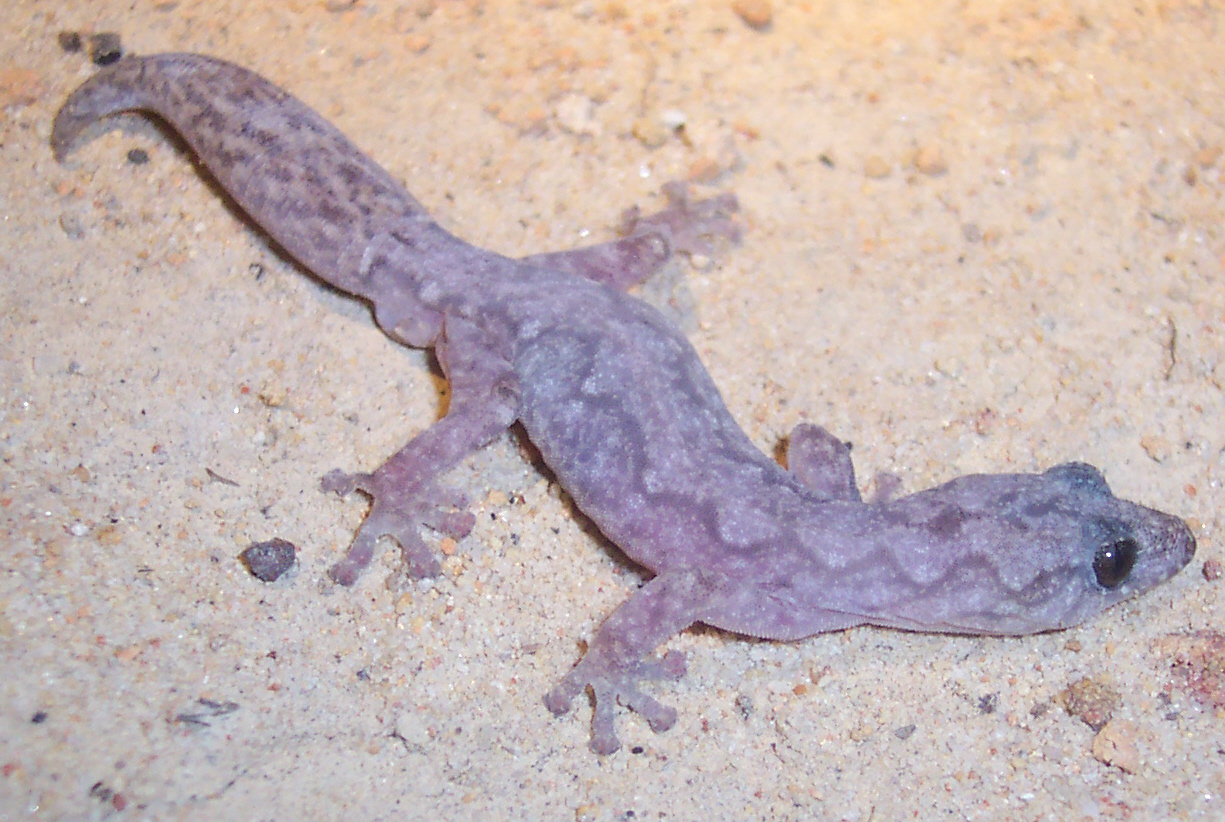
- Amalosia lesueurii

Scientific classification
- Kingdom: Animalia
- Phylum: Chordata
- Class: Reptilia
- Order: Squamata
- Suborder: Gekkota
- Family: Diplodactylidae
- Genus: Amalosia; Wells & Wellington, 1984

= Amalosia =

Genus of lizards

Amalosia is a genus of lizards in the family Diplodactylidae. The genus is endemic to Australia. It includes four species:

== Taxonomy ==
All species of the genus Amalosia were previously included within the genus Oedura until 2012, when Oliver et al. transferred four species to this genus and erected two new monotypic genera, Hesperoedura for Oedura reticulata and Nebulifera for Oedura robusta. Some taxonomic authorities still place all four species in the former genus. All species are native to Australia.

== Species ==
The following four species are recognized as being valid.

- Amalosia jacovae (Couper, Keim & Hoskin, 2007)
- Amalosia lesueurii (A.M.C. Duméril & Bibron, 1836)
- Amalosia obscura (King, 1985)
- Amalosia rhombifer (J.E. Gray, 1845)

Nota bene: A binomial authority in parentheses indicates that the species was originally described in a genus other than Amalosia.
