= Burt (crocodile) =

Australian crocodile (died 2024)

- Burt in 2024
- Species: Crocodylus porosus
- Sex: Male
- Hatched: Northern Territory, Australia
- Died: 21–22 December 2024; Crocosaurus Cove, Northern Territory, Australia
- Known for: Crocodile Dundee
- Weight: 700 kg (1,543 lb)
- Named after: Burt Reynolds

Burt (c. 1920s or 1930s – December 2024) was an Australian saltwater crocodile who appeared in the 1986 film Crocodile Dundee. He died in December 2024, estimated to be at least 90 years old.

Burt was named after Burt Reynolds. He was cast in Crocodile Dundee a few years after being captured in the wild from the Reynolds River in Australia's Northern Territory. Burt appears in a scene where American journalist Sue Charlton (portrayed by Linda Kozlowski) is saved by Mick Dundee (Paul Hogan) during a crocodile attack. Burt also served as the visual effects model in the 2007 Australian film Rogue.

From 2008, he lived at Crocosaurus Cove, a crocodile sanctuary in Darwin, where staff noted his "fiery temperament". In 2018, he was used in an attempt to predict the 2018 FIFA World Cup final between France and Croatia. Burt was presented with flags with chicken wings attached, which were the same size and colour. Burt first bit the French flag, and France later won the match, leading to him being dubbed the "Psychic Croc" by Northern Territory News. Burt had previously been used in an incorrect prediction that Australia would defeat France during their group match at the same tournament.

Burt died at Crocosaurus Cove on the weekend of 21–22 December 2024, from advanced metastatic cancer . The sanctuary described him as a "fierce and fascinating ambassador for crocodile education" and stated they would erect a commemorative sign in his honour. Burt's precise age at death is unknown, as he was captured in the 1980s at an indeterminate age. Experts estimate that he was likely nearing 100 years old. He was measured to be 5 metres (16 ft) long and weighed 700 kilograms (1,543 lb).

== See also ==
- List of animal actors
