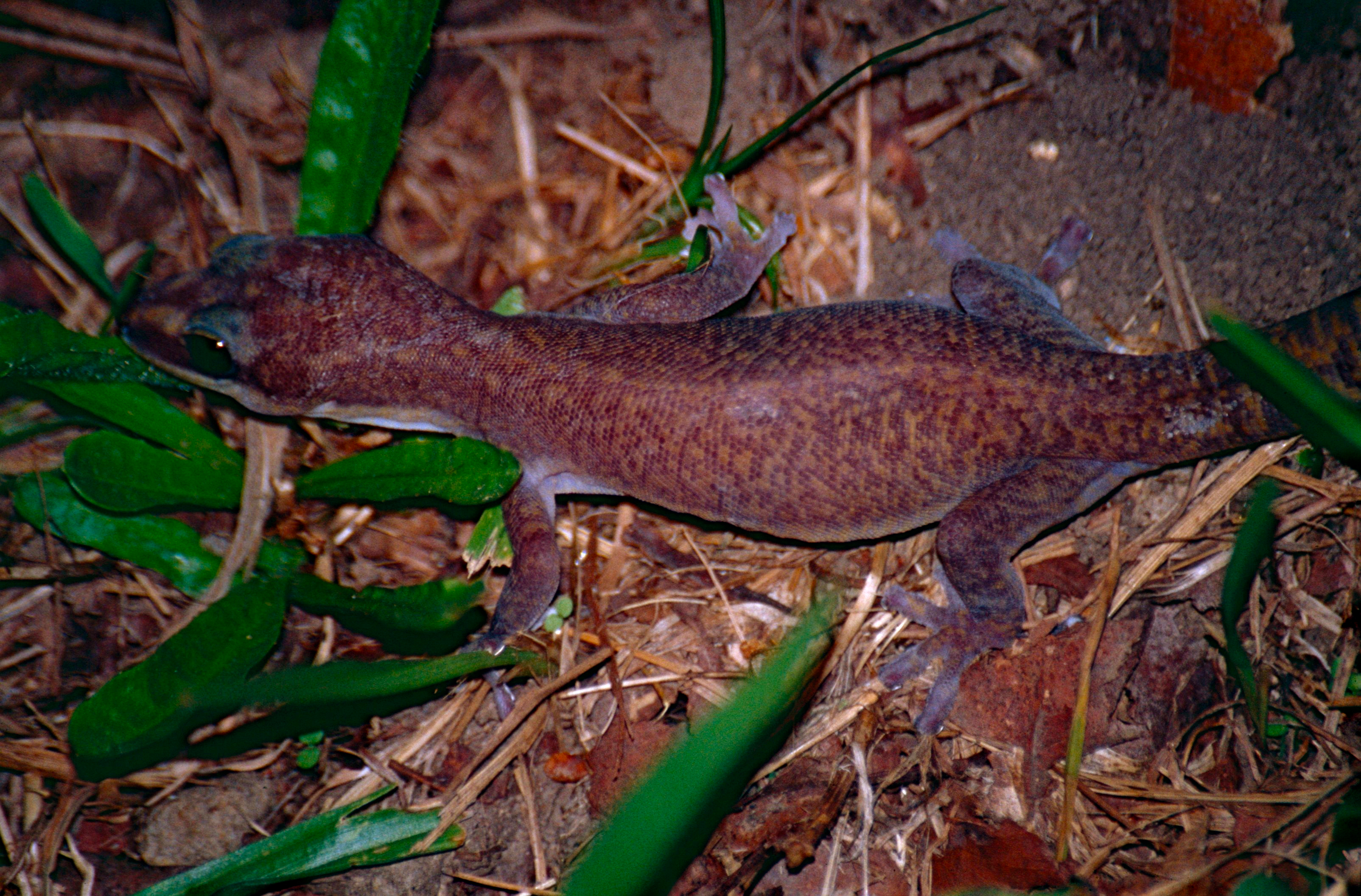

Scientific classification
- Domain: Eukaryota
- Kingdom: Animalia
- Phylum: Chordata
- Class: Reptilia
- Order: Squamata
- Infraorder: Gekkota
- Family: Diplodactylidae
- Genus: Oedura
- Species: O. monilis

Binomial name
- Oedura monilis De Vis, 1888

= Ocellated velvet gecko =

Species of lizard

The ocellated velvet gecko, ocellated gecko, or blotched gecko (Oedura monilis) is a gecko endemic to Queensland and New South Wales in Australia. The species was formerly known as Oedura attenboroughi before it fell out of use due to the species name being synonymised.
