= Oedura coggeri =

Conservation status
- Least Concern (IUCN 3.1)

Scientific classification
- Kingdom: Animalia
- Phylum: Chordata
- Class: Reptilia
- Order: Squamata
- Suborder: Gekkota
- Family: Diplodactylidae
- Genus: Oedura
- Species: O. coggeri

Binomial name
- Oedura coggeri Bustard, 1966

Species of lizard

Oedura coggeri, commonly known as the northern spotted velvet gecko, is a species of gecko, a lizard in the family Diplodactylidae. The species is endemic to Queensland, Australia.

== Etymology ==
The specific name, coggeri, is in honor of Australian herpetologist Harold Cogger.

== Habitat ==
The preferred natural habitat of O. coggeri is rocky areas in forest.

== Reproduction ==
O. coggeri is oviparous.
