= Oedura luritja =

Scientific classification
- Kingdom: Animalia
- Phylum: Chordata
- Class: Reptilia
- Order: Squamata
- Suborder: Gekkota
- Family: Diplodactylidae
- Genus: Oedura
- Species: O. luritja

Binomial name
- Oedura luritja Oliver & McDonald, 2016

Species of lizard

Oedura luritja, also called the Mereenie velvet gecko, is a species of geckos endemic to the Northern Territory of Australia.
