= Amalosia obscura =

Conservation status
- Least Concern (IUCN 3.1)

Scientific classification
- Kingdom: Animalia
- Phylum: Chordata
- Class: Reptilia
- Order: Squamata
- Suborder: Gekkota
- Family: Diplodactylidae
- Genus: Amalosia
- Species: A. obscura

Binomial name
- Amalosia obscura (King, 1985)

Synonyms
- Oedura obscura King, 1985; Amalosia obscura — Wells & Wellington, 1989; Oedura obscura — Kluge, 1993; Amalosia obscura — Oliver et al., 2012

Species of lizard

Amalosia obscura, also known commonly as the slim velvet gecko is a species of lizard in the family Diplodactylidae. The species is endemic to Australia.

== Geographic range ==
A. obscura is native to the Australian state of Western Australia.

== Habitat ==
The preferred natural habitat of A. obscura is rocky areas.

== Reproduction ==
A. obscura is oviparous.
