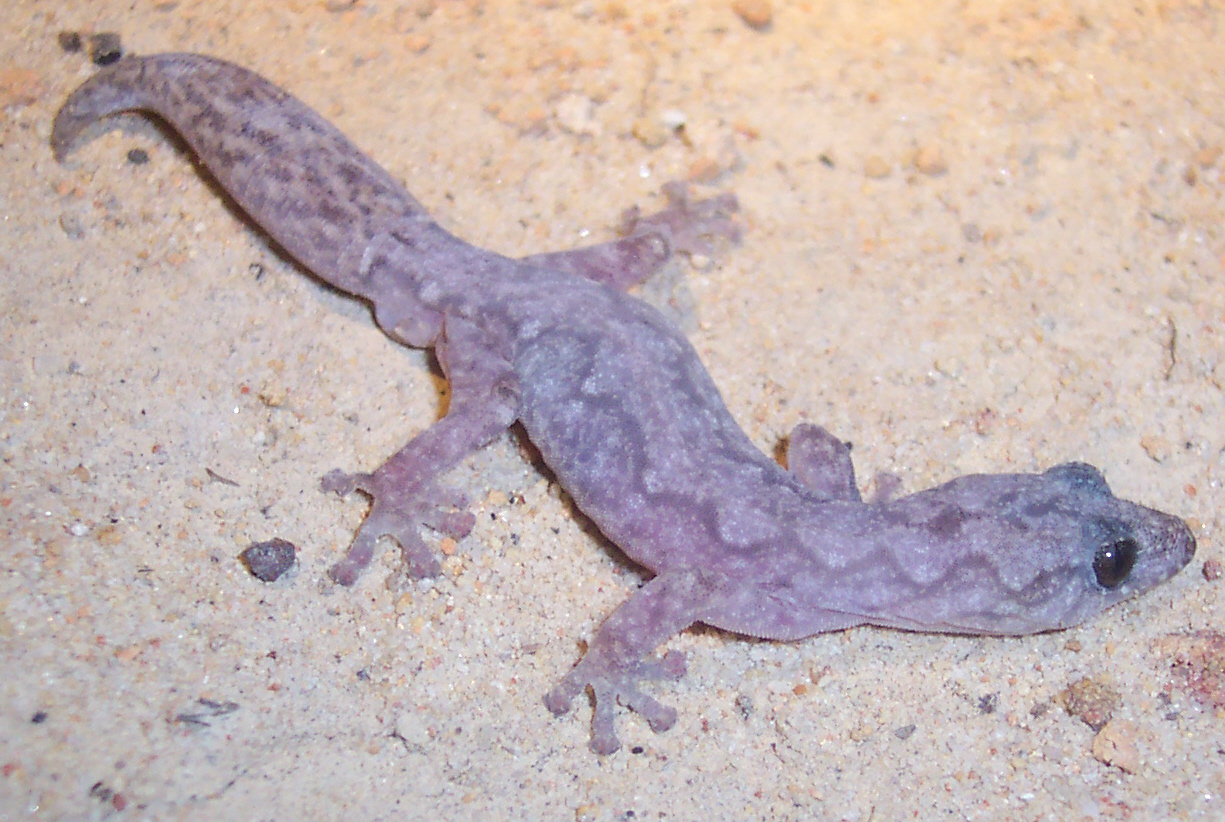

Conservation status
- Least Concern (IUCN 3.1)

Scientific classification
- Kingdom: Animalia
- Phylum: Chordata
- Class: Reptilia
- Order: Squamata
- Suborder: Gekkota
- Family: Diplodactylidae
- Genus: Amalosia
- Species: A. lesueurii

Binomial name
- Amalosia lesueurii (A.M.C. Duméril & Bibron, 1836)

Synonyms
- Phyllodactylus lesueurii A.M.C. Duméril & Bibron, 1836; Diplodactylus (Pachyurus) lesueurii — Fitzinger, 1843; Oedura rhombifer Gray, 1845; Oedura lesueurii — Boulenger, 1885

= Amalosia lesueurii =

Species of lizard

Amalosia lesueurii, commonly known as Lesueur's gecko or Lesueur's velvet gecko, is a species of gecko, a lizard in the family Diplodactylidae. The species is endemic to Australia.

== Etymology ==
The specific name, lesueurii, is in honor of French naturalist Charles Alexandre Lesueur.

== Description ==
A. lesueurii is a small gecko. Adults usually have a snout-to-vent length (SVL) of 8 cm (3.1 in). It is a mottled grey colour.

== Geographic range ==
A. lesuerii is found near the eastern coastline of New South Wales and Queensland.

== Behaviour ==
Although it is perhaps the most common gecko in the Sydney region, A. lesuerii is rarely observed unless it is disturbed. During the day it hides under close-fitting rocks, and comes out at night to hunt insects.

== Reproduction ==
Males of A. lesueurii reach sexual maturity at two years, but females not until four years old. The species is oviparous. Clutch size is two eggs.
