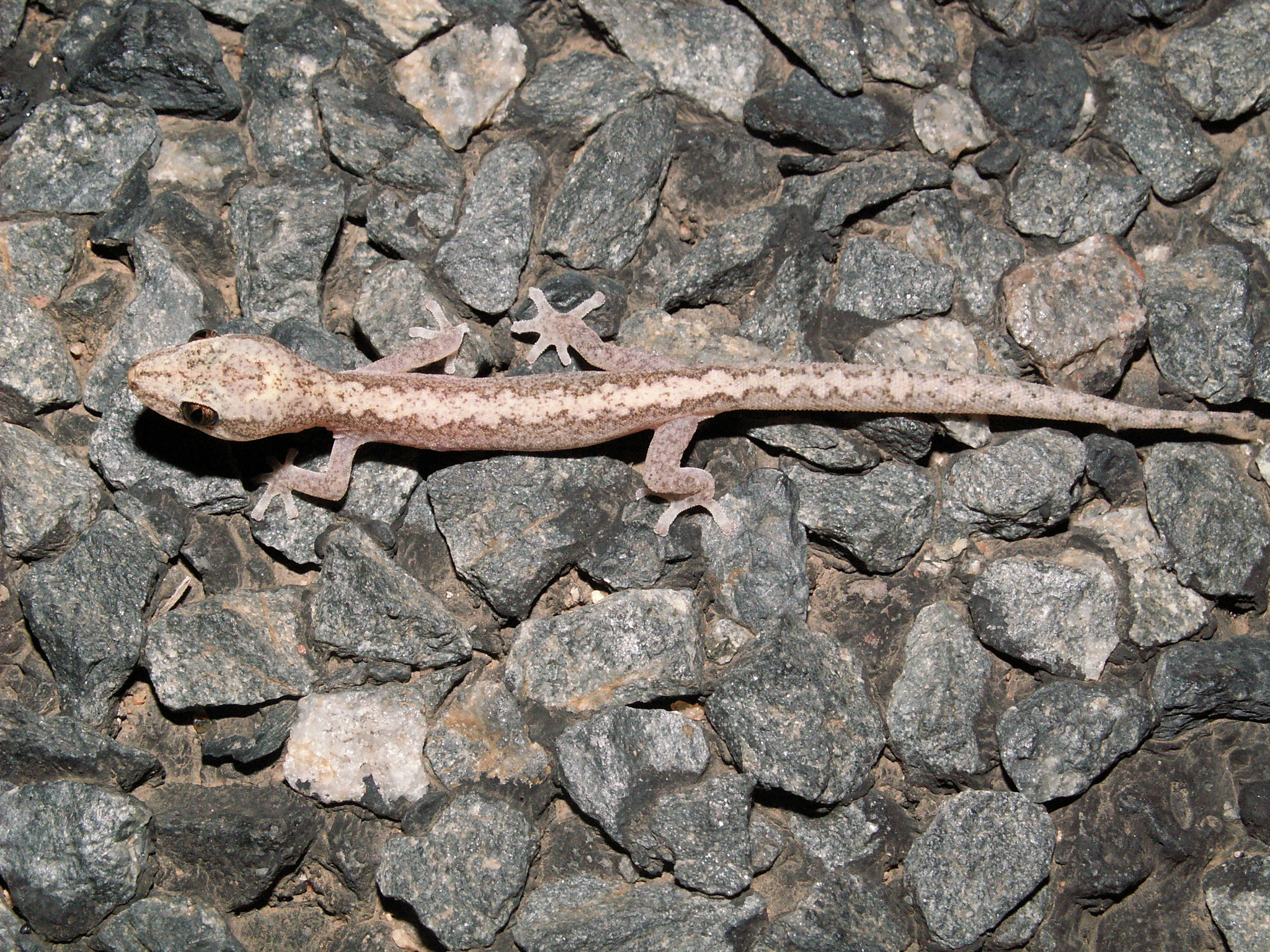

Conservation status
- Least Concern (IUCN 3.1)

Scientific classification
- Kingdom: Animalia
- Phylum: Chordata
- Class: Reptilia
- Order: Squamata
- Suborder: Gekkota
- Family: Diplodactylidae
- Genus: Amalosia
- Species: A. rhombifer

Binomial name
- Amalosia rhombifer (J.E. Gray, 1845)

Synonyms
- Oedura rhombifer J.E. Gray, 1845; Oedura lesueurii rhombifer — Cogger, 1957; Amalosia rhombifer — Wells & Wellington, 1984; Oedura rhombifer — Kluge, 1993; Amalosia rhombifer — Oliver et al., 2012

= Amalosia rhombifer =

Zigzag velvet gecko

Species of lizard

Amalosia rhombifer, also known commonly as the zigzag velvet gecko and the zig-zag gecko, is a species of lizard in the family Diplodactylidae. The species is endemic to Australia.

== Description ==
The zigzag velvet gecko can reach a total length (including tail) of 16 cm (6.3 in). It is light brown on the back, darker brown on the sides, and white or off-white below. The limbs can be speckled, pale brown, or dark brown. The coloring makes it appear to have a zigzag edge on the sides, and tail.

== Geographic distribution ==
A. rhombifer is found in northern Australia, in the Kimberley region, in Western Australia, and up to northern Queensland. Some species have been reported in the Alice Springs region.

== Habitat ==
The zigzag gecko prefers wooded habitats, and has been found under the bark of deteriorating trees, but has also been recorded in areas with rubbish or buildings.

== Behavior ==
A. rhombifer is usually arboreal, but sometimes seeks shelter beneath ground litter.

== Reproduction ==
A. rhombifer is oviparous.

== Threats ==
The zigzag velvet gecko is a rare species. Until 2002, no recent records existed. In 2002, one specimen was found near Warialda, New South Wales, another in Bebo State Forest, and third specimen discovered in Arakoola Nature Reserve, south of Bebo.

The species is severely endangered, due to habitat loss from logging, and bush fires, predators such as foxes, and feral cats, and the nature of the isolation of the gecko's population, resulting in a lack of genetic variability. The New South Wales National Parks and Wildlife Service report that the species is likely to become extinct, without intervention.
