= Fringe-toed velvet gecko =

Conservation status
- Least Concern (IUCN 3.1)

Scientific classification
- Kingdom: Animalia
- Phylum: Chordata
- Class: Reptilia
- Order: Squamata
- Suborder: Gekkota
- Family: Diplodactylidae
- Genus: Oedura
- Species: O. filicipoda

Binomial name
- Oedura filicipoda King, 1985

Species of lizard

The fringe-toed velvet gecko (Oedura filicipoda) is a gecko endemic to Western Australia.
