= Oedura gemmata =

Scientific classification
- Domain: Eukaryota
- Kingdom: Animalia
- Phylum: Chordata
- Class: Reptilia
- Order: Squamata
- Infraorder: Gekkota
- Family: Diplodactylidae
- Genus: Oedura
- Species: O. gemmata

Binomial name
- Oedura gemmata King & Gow, 1983

Species of lizard

Oedura gemmata, also called the jewelled velvet gecko or dotted velvet gecko, is a gecko endemic to Northern Territory in Australia.

They normally measure 50 cm long head to tail. They live in the Northern territory of Australia, they like to live in rocky places.
