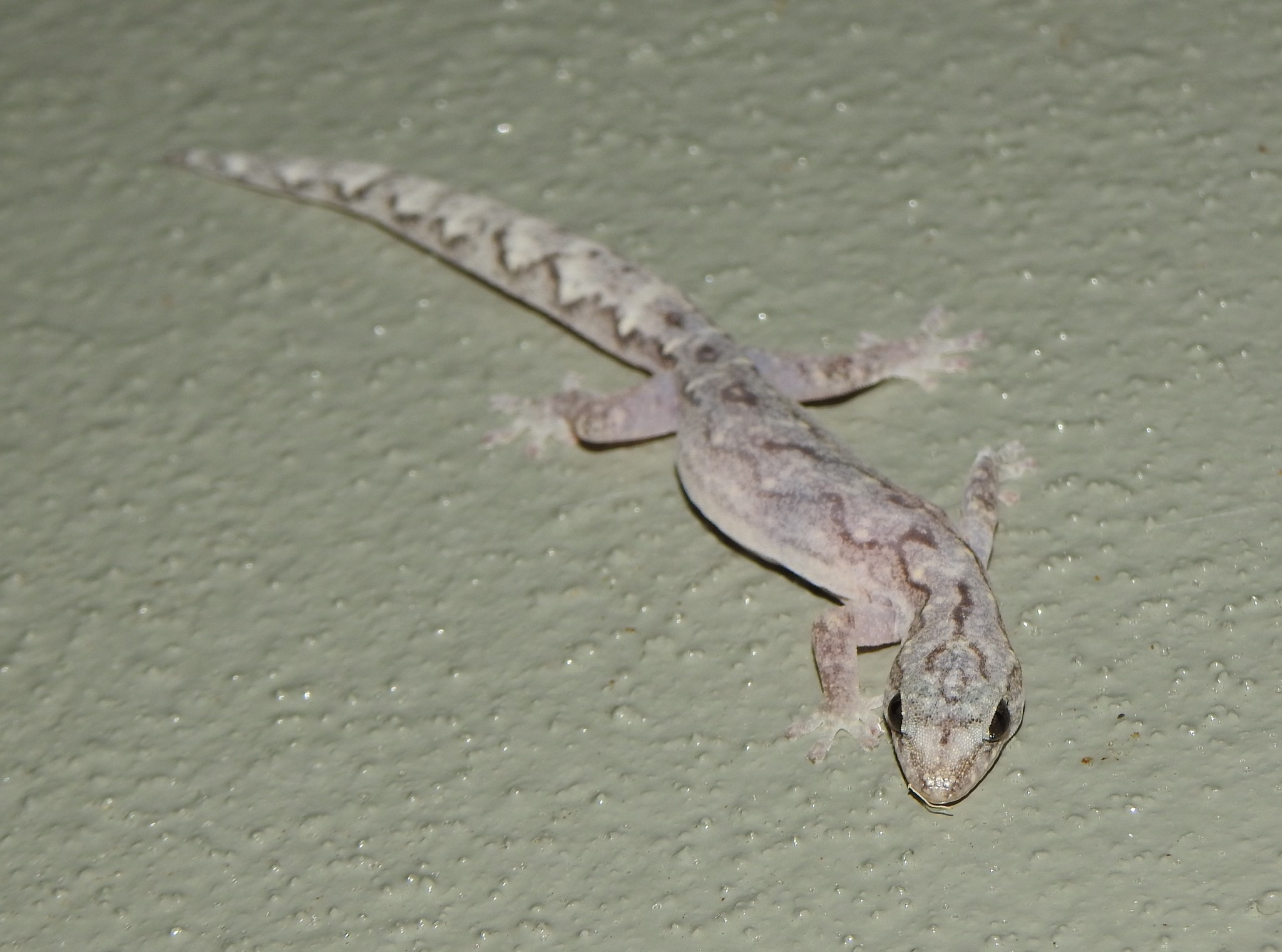

Conservation status
- Least Concern (IUCN 3.1)

Scientific classification
- Kingdom: Animalia
- Phylum: Chordata
- Class: Reptilia
- Order: Squamata
- Suborder: Gekkota
- Family: Diplodactylidae
- Genus: Amalosia
- Species: A. jacovae

Binomial name
- Amalosia jacovae (Couper, Keim & Hoskin, 2007)

Synonyms
- Oedura jacovae Couper, Keim & Hoskin, 2007; Amalosia jacovae — P.M. Oliver et al., 2012

= Amalosia jacovae =

Species of lizard

Amalosia jacovae, also known commonly as the clouded gecko or the clouded velvet gecko, is a species of lizard in the family Diplodactylidae. The species is endemic to Australia.

== Etymology ==
The specific name, jacovae (Latin, feminine, genitive singular), is in honor of Australian herpetologist Jeanette Adelaide Covacevich ( j + a + cov + suffix -ae).

== Geographic range ==
A. jacovae is found in southeastern Queensland, Australia.

== Habitat ==
The preferred natural habitats of A. jacovae are forest and shrubland, but it has also been found in houses.

== Description ==
Medium-sized for its genus, A. jacovae may attain a snout-to-vent length (SVL) of 6.2 cm (2.4 in). Dorsally, it has a pale gray vertebral zone, and it has pronounced basal webbing between its third and fourth toes.

== Reproduction ==
A. jacovae is oviparous.
