= Oedura bella =

Conservation status
- Least Concern (IUCN 3.1)

Scientific classification
- Kingdom: Animalia
- Phylum: Chordata
- Class: Reptilia
- Order: Squamata
- Suborder: Gekkota
- Family: Diplodactylidae
- Genus: Oedura
- Species: O. bella

Binomial name
- Oedura bella P. Oliver & Doughty, 2016

Species of lizard

Oedura bella, sometimes called the gulf marbled velvet gecko, is a species of geckos endemic to Queensland and Northern Territory in Australia.
