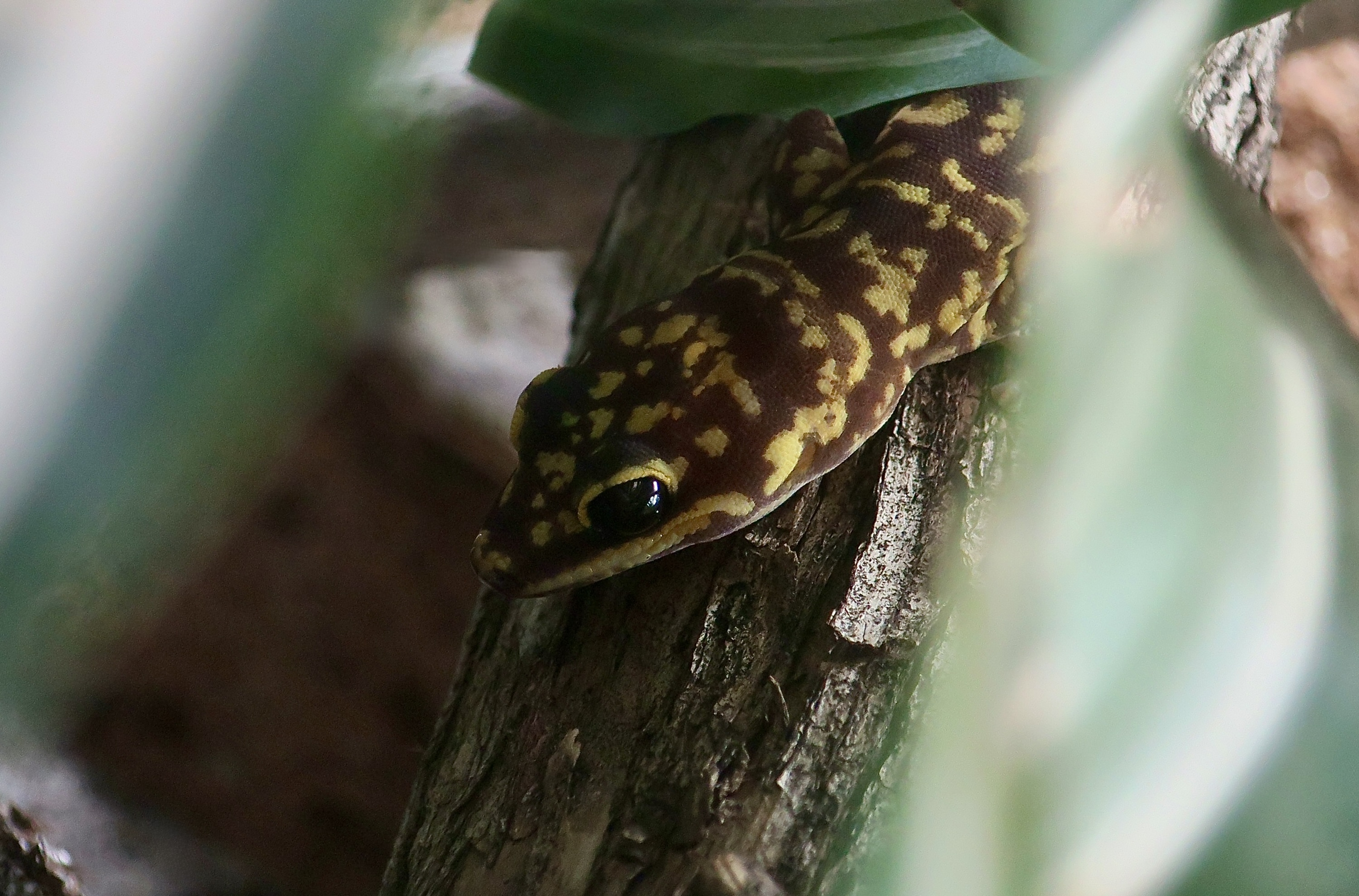

Scientific classification
- Kingdom: Animalia
- Phylum: Chordata
- Class: Reptilia
- Order: Squamata
- Suborder: Gekkota
- Family: Diplodactylidae
- Genus: Oedura
- Species: O. fimbria

Binomial name
- Oedura fimbria Oliver & Doughty, 2016

= Oedura fimbria =

Species of lizard

Oedura fimbria, also called the western marbled velvet gecko, is a species of geckos endemic to Western Australia.
