= Marbled velvet gecko =

Scientific classification
- Domain: Eukaryota
- Kingdom: Animalia
- Phylum: Chordata
- Class: Reptilia
- Order: Squamata
- Infraorder: Gekkota
- Family: Diplodactylidae
- Genus: Oedura
- Species: O. marmorata

Binomial name
- Oedura marmorata Gray, 1842

Species of lizard

The marbled velvet gecko (Oedura marmorata) is a gecko endemic to Australia.
