= Reticulated velvet gecko =

Conservation status
- Least Concern (IUCN 3.1)

Scientific classification
- Kingdom: Animalia
- Phylum: Chordata
- Class: Reptilia
- Order: Squamata
- Suborder: Gekkota
- Family: Diplodactylidae
- Genus: Hesperoedura; Oliver, Bauer, Greenbaum, Jackman & Hobbie, 2012
- Species: H. reticulata

Binomial name
- Hesperoedura reticulata Bustard, 1969

Synonyms
- Oedura reticulata; Amalosia reticulata

Species of lizard

The reticulated velvet gecko (Hesperoedura reticulata) is a species of geckos endemic to Australia.
