= A. mitchelli =

A. mitchelli may refer to:

- Abronia mitchelli, an arboreal alligator lizard species
- Amphisbaena mitchelli, a worm lizard species
- Andriasa mitchelli, Hayes, 1973, a moth species
- Anopsicus mitchelli, Gertsch, 1971, a spider species found in Mexico

== See also ==
- Mitchelli (disambiguation)
