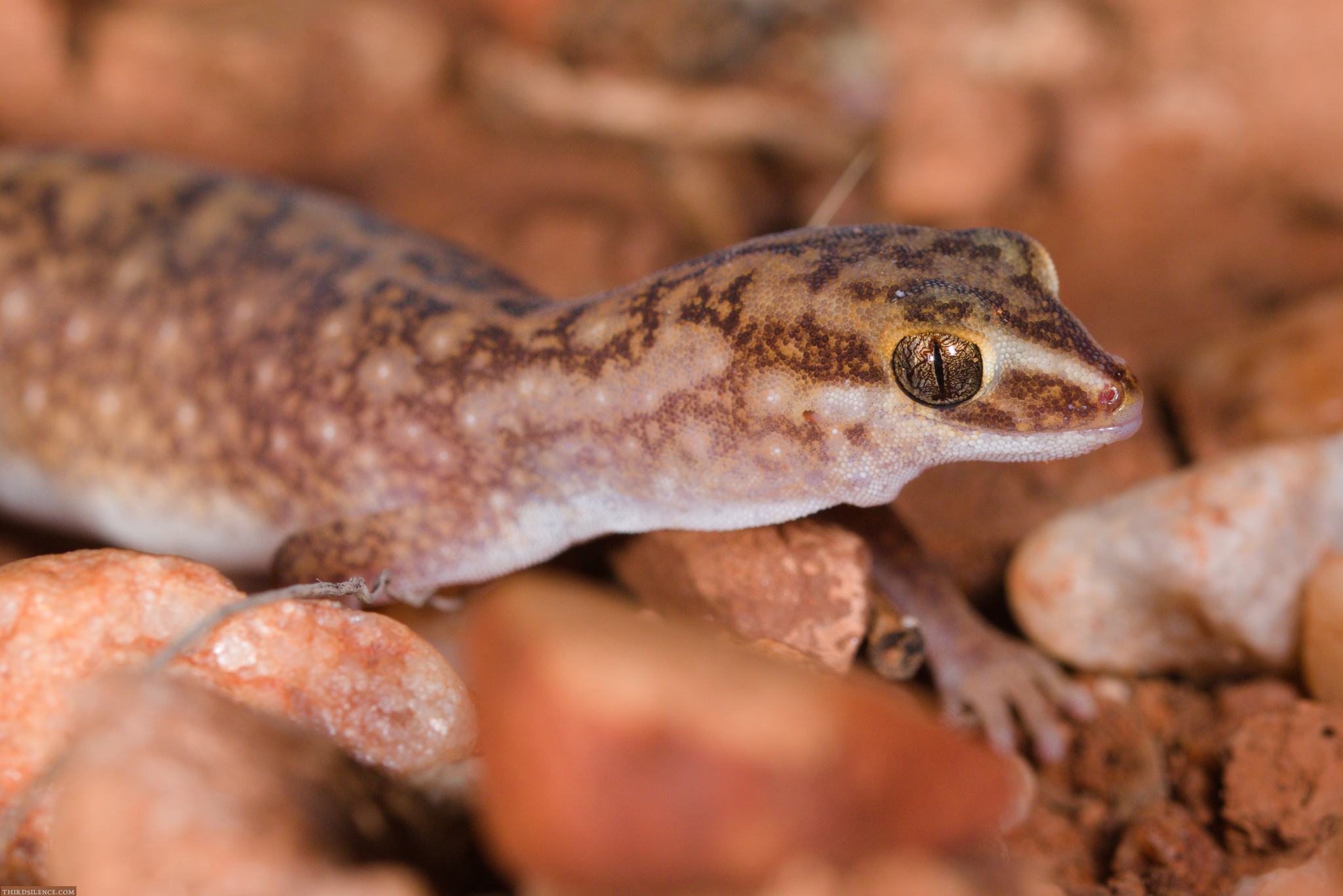

Conservation status
- Least Concern (IUCN 3.1)

Scientific classification
- Kingdom: Animalia
- Phylum: Chordata
- Class: Reptilia
- Order: Squamata
- Suborder: Gekkota
- Family: Diplodactylidae
- Genus: Diplodactylus
- Species: D. conspicillatus

Binomial name
- Diplodactylus conspicillatus Lucas & C. Frost, 1897

Synonyms
- Gymnodactylus laevis Sternfeld, 1925

= Diplodactylus conspicillatus =

Species of lizard

Diplodactylus conspicillatus, also known commonly as the variable fat-tailed gecko or the burrow-plug gecko, is a species of lizard in the family Diplodactylidae. The species is endemic to Australia, where it is found in central and arid inland areas. Widespread across the continent, the variable fat-tailed gecko is most commonly found in sandy desert habitats dominated by spinifex grasses. It has also been bred in captivity by zoos and as pets.

== Description ==
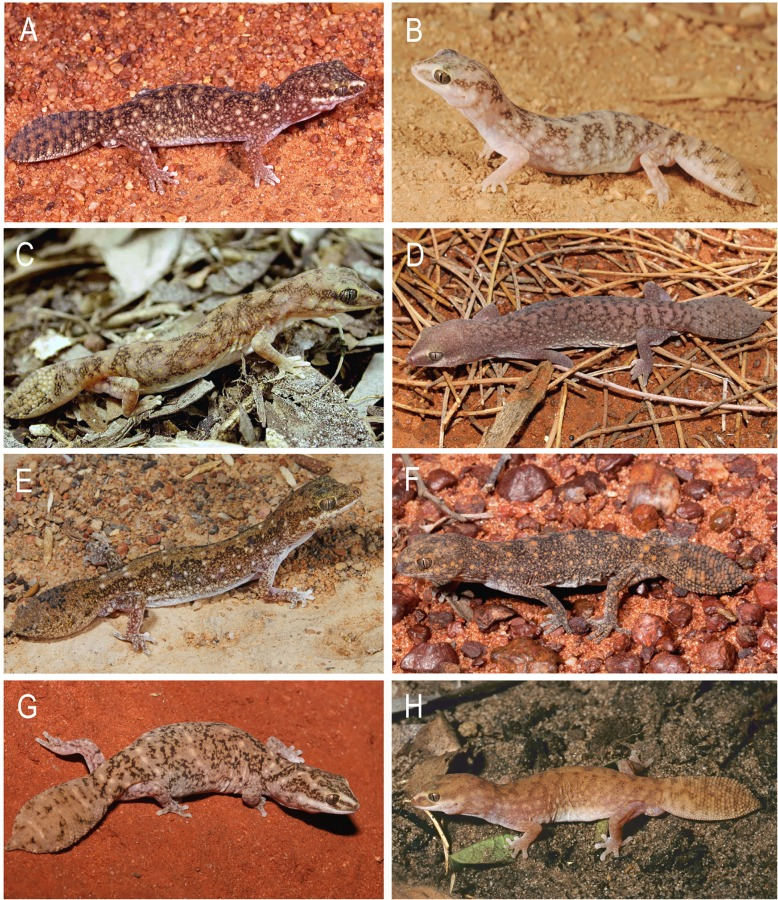
D. conspicillatus (A, B) and other species in its species complex (C-H)

The variable fat-tailed gecko is small-medium-sized gecko with a pale fawn to reddish-brown body. It has a dark brown reticulated pattern over the dorsal aspect of its body and pale to white speckles covering the body. Limbs, lips and underside of the gecko are paler than the rest of the body and a dark streak is present between the snout and eye, sometimes continuing beyond the eye.

The variable fat-tailed gecko has a stout body, short limbs and a broad, flat tail of similar size to the head. It is approximately 60 mm (2.4 in) long, snout-to-vent (SVL = measurement taken from the tip of an animal's nose to the opening of the cloaca) with a tail length around 40% of the SVL.

The dorsal scales are large and homogenous, continuing into plate-like scales on the tail. The nostril is separated from the rostral scale by an anterior nasal scale, and the mental scale is hemispherical in shape. It has a large primary supralabial scale followed by small, granular supralabials no larger than the adjacent loreals.

Like most gecko species, the variable fat-tailed gecko lacks a moveable eyelid and instead relies on a long, flexible tongue to keep its eyes moist and clean.

Both male and female variable fat-tailed geckos possess paracloacal (parallel to the cloaca) spurs, small clusters of around 3-8 spines. Although present in both sexes, paracloacal spurs in females are rarely more than 50% larger than adjacent body scales. In addition to paracloacal spurs, a key identifying feature of the variable fat-tailed gecko is a lack of pre-anal pores.

== Taxonomy ==
D. conspicillatus was described as a species new to science in 1897 by Arthur Henry Lucas and Charles Frost.

The genus Diplodactylus consists of 27 gecko species commonly referred to as stone geckos or fat-tailed geckos. Species within the genus are morphologically similar but genetically distinct. For example, D. kenneallyi, D. savagei, D. pulcher and D. conspicillatus all share similar morphological traits. As a result, many Diplodactylus species have been reclassified and redescribed over the years to more accurately represent the diversity within the genus.

== Distribution and habitat ==
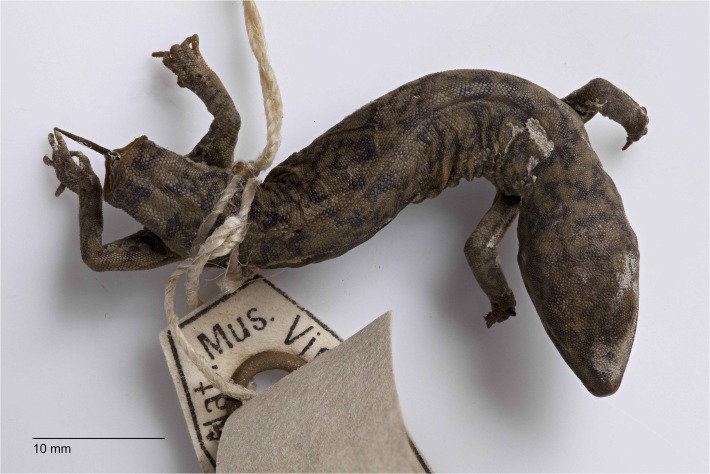
Preserved lectotype specimen (NMV D7535)

D. conspicillatus is widely distributed across mainland Australia within arid and semi-arid habitats. It ranges from inland New South Wales, Queensland and South Australia to northern regions of Western Australia and the Northern Territory. It is also found in coastal regions of north-western Western Australia and north-eastern Northern Territory.

This terrestrial gecko inhabits a variety of ecosystems including sandy deserts, open grasslands, shrublands, rocky outcrops and stony ranges, although it is most commonly found in sandy deserts dominated by spinifex grasses. It is often found sheltering in fallen trees, cracks in the soil, among rocks and in abandoned lizard/spider burrows.

== Ecology ==
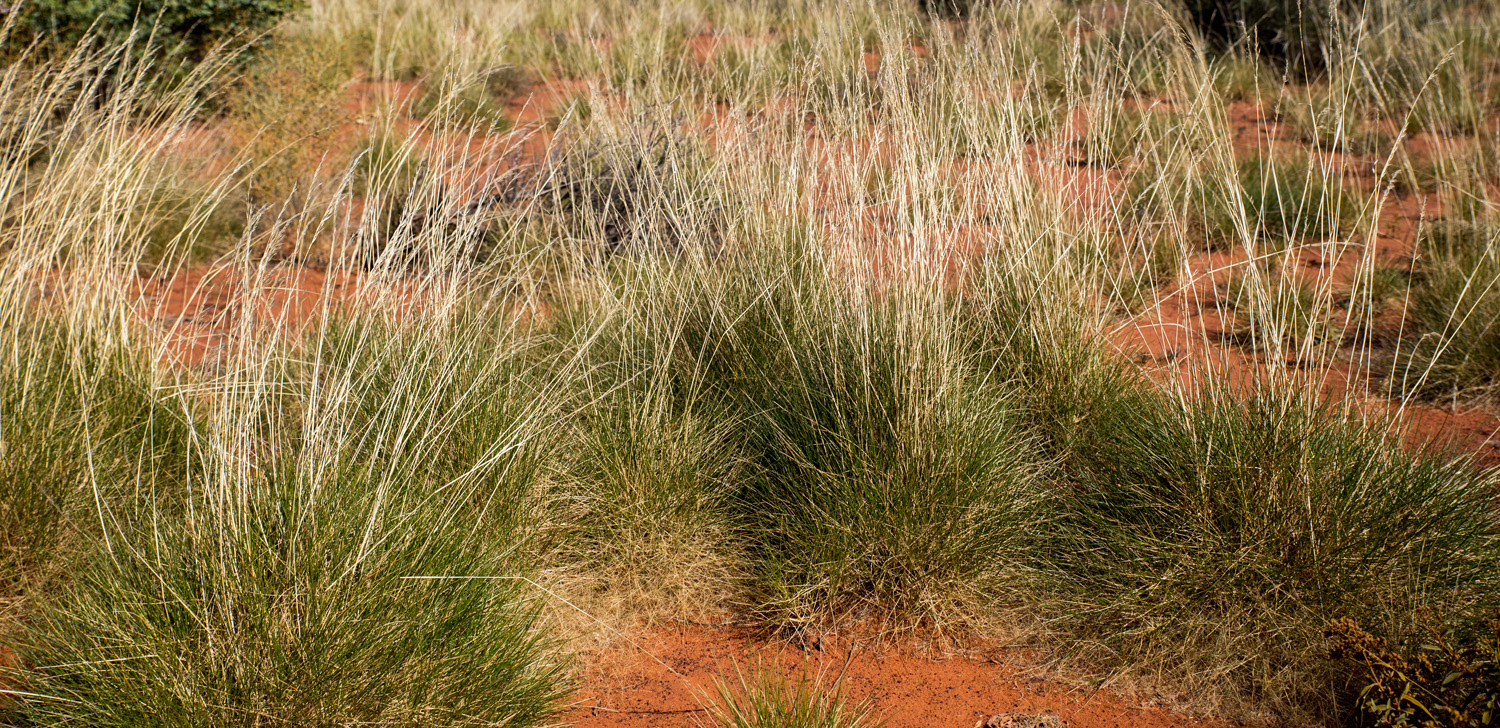
Sandy desert and spinifex grass habitat

The variable fat-tailed gecko is nocturnal (active during the night) and like most lizards is ectothermic, absorbing warmth and energy from the sun during the day, so it can then hunt and digest its food at night. As a nocturnal species, the variable fat-tailed gecko seeks out warm places to shelter in during the day such as rocks, fallen trees and abandoned burrows of spiders and other lizards. Shelter-seeking behaviour is observed in many desert dwelling species to provide protection from diurnal (active during the day) predators and prevent body temperatures from exceeding the preferred body temperature (PBT).

Endemic to remote areas of Australia, there is little known about the behaviours and ecology of the variable fat-tailed gecko. This dilemma is also contributed to by the difficulties often faced identifying this species correctly due to similarities with other diplodactylids. Further research into breeding, hunting and adaptive behaviours as well as the ecophysiology of this species is needed.

== Diet ==
The variable fat-tailed gecko is a specialist feeder, feeding almost exclusively on termites. In addition to termites, this insectivore will also eat crickets, spiders, ants and other small insects.

Water sources in many arid zones of Australia are scarce; so the variable fat-tailed gecko most likely obtains water from morning dew and other water residues.

== Reproduction ==
D. conspicillatus is oviparous, meaning it lays eggs as opposed to giving birth to live young. It breeds from September to February and from November to March in more northern areas. Little is known about its mating behaviour; however, it is thought cloacal spurs are most likely used to grasp the female during copulation.

Gravid females exhibit a marked increase in girth before laying their eggs in shallow scapes of moist sand or on the sand surface beneath fallen trees and other vegetation. Typical clutch size is 1–2 eggs, with females laying multiple clutches per season. Each egg measures 15.5 mm × 9.25 mm (0.610 in × 0.364 in), and the eggs reach full incubation (hatch) in around 59–65 days. The average hatchling size is 24–27 mm (0.94–1.06 in) (SVL).

In captivity, the variable fat-tailed gecko has been observed to reach sexual maturity at 70-80% of adult SVL around 12–18 months of age.

== Predators and threats ==
Natural predators of the variable fat-tailed gecko include birds of prey, snakes and other lizards. Many of these predators are avoided during the day by seeking shelter.

The variable fat-tailed gecko is currently listed on the IUCN Red List as of least concern. However, although not currently threatened like many Australian species, it is still susceptible to increasing environmental threats such as habitat degradation, habitat loss, climate change and predation by feral species such as cats, dogs and foxes.
