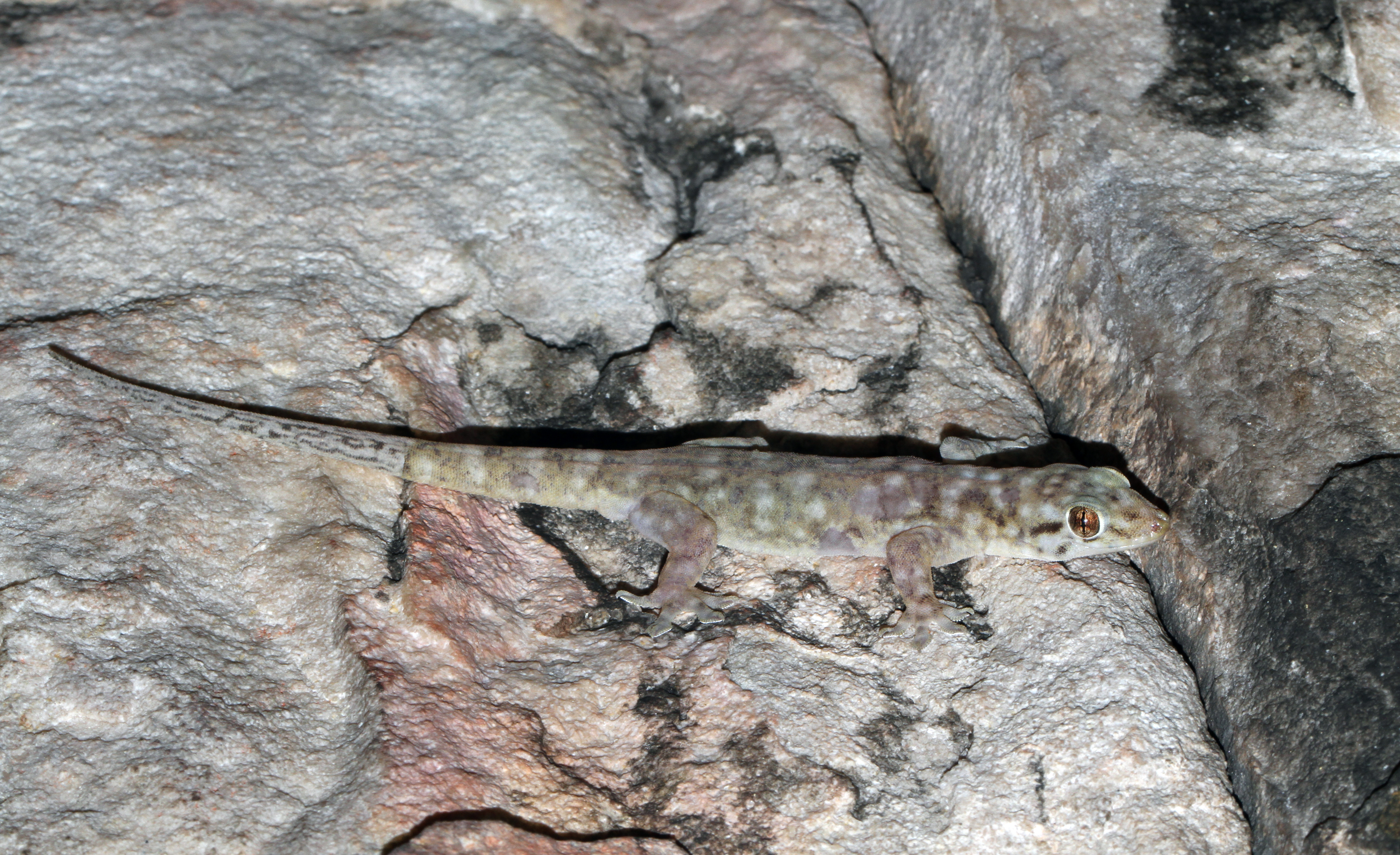

Scientific classification
- Kingdom: Animalia
- Phylum: Chordata
- Class: Reptilia
- Order: Squamata
- Suborder: Gekkota
- Family: Gekkonidae
- Genus: Gehyra
- Species: G. pamela

Binomial name
- Gehyra pamela King, 1982

Synonyms
- Gehyra pamela King, 1982; Dactyloperus pamela — Wells & Wellington, 1984; Phyriadoria pamela — Wells & Wellington, 1989; Gehyra pamela — Kluge, 1993

= Gehyra pamela =

Species of lizard

Gehyra pamela, also known commonly as the Arnhemland watercourse dtella or the Arnhem Land spotted dtella, is a species of gecko, a lizard in the family Gekkonidae. The species is endemic to the Northern Territory in Australia.

== Etymology ==
The specific name, pamela, is in honor of Pamela King, who is the wife of taxon author Max King.

== Taxonomy ==
Gehyra pamela is part of the Gehyra australis species complex.

== Reproduction ==
G. pamela is oviparous.
