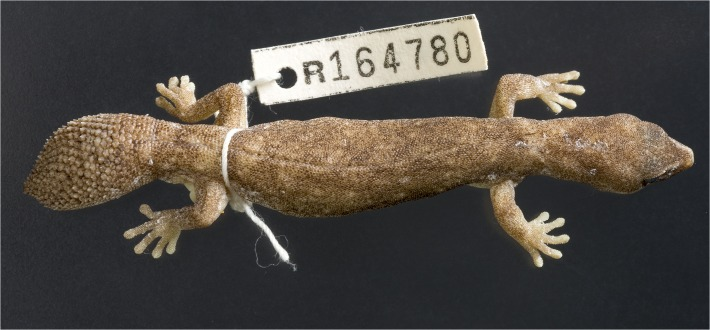

Conservation status
- Least Concern (IUCN 3.1)

Scientific classification
- Kingdom: Animalia
- Phylum: Chordata
- Class: Reptilia
- Order: Squamata
- Suborder: Gekkota
- Family: Diplodactylidae
- Genus: Diplodactylus
- Species: D. custos

Binomial name
- Diplodactylus custos Couper, Pepper & P. Oliver, 2014

= Diplodactylus custos =

Species of lizard

Diplodactylus custos, sometimes called the Kimberley fat-tailed gecko, is a gecko endemic to Australia.

== Description ==
The gecko typically has a length from snout to vent of around 6.1 cm (2.4 in). It is oviparous and lays a clutch of two eggs. It belongs to the Diplodactylus conspicillatus group and is one of the larger members. D. custos has a canthal stripe which is well-defined and an enlarged first supralabial. It has large plate-like mid-dorsal scales on the trunk and smaller dorsolateral scales. The original tail has a short extension at tip that is acute and attenuated. A regenerated tail tends to have a rounder distal end and more uniform scales. The dorsal surface has scales that are arranged in uniform sized transverse rows. The crown and snout have darker pigmentation. The diffuse body pattern can also have wavy, dark transverse bands.

== Taxonomy ==
The species was first formally described by the herpetologists Couper, Oliver & Pepper in 2014. The specific epithet is taken from the Latin word custos meaning guard which refers to the Australian Wildlife Conservancy's conservation efforts in the Kimberley region where the species in endemic.

== Distribution ==
The gecko is reasonable widespread throughout the Kimberley region in the north west of Australia. Its range extends from Kununurra in the north down to Derby in the south west and Purnululu National Park in the south. Specimens have also been found on Yampi Peninsula and on Koolan Island.
