= Helmeted gecko =

Helmeted gecko is a common name for several lizards and may refer to:

- Diplodactylus galeatus, native to the continent of Australia
- Tarentola chazaliae, native to Africa
