= H. mitchelli =

H. mitchelli may refer to:

- Hemirrhagus mitchelli, Gertsch, 1982, a spider species in the genus Hemirrhagus and the family Theraphosidae found in Mexico
- Hyperolius mitchelli, a frog species found in Malawi, Mozambique and Tanzania

== See also ==
- Mitchelli (disambiguation)
