= Diplodactylus kenneallyi =

Conservation status
- Data Deficient (IUCN 3.1)

Scientific classification
- Kingdom: Animalia
- Phylum: Chordata
- Class: Reptilia
- Order: Squamata
- Suborder: Gekkota
- Family: Diplodactylidae
- Genus: Diplodactylus
- Species: D. kenneallyi

Binomial name
- Diplodactylus kenneallyi Storr, 1988

Synonyms
- Diplodactylus kenneallyi Storr, 1988; Manwellisaurus kenneallyi — Wells & Wellington, 1989; Diplodactylus kenneallyi — Kluge, 1993

Species of lizard

Diplodactylus kenneallyi, sometimes called commonly Kenneally's gecko, is a species of gecko, a lizard in the family Gekkonidae. The species is endemic to Australia.

== Etymology ==
The specific name, kenneallyi, is in honor of Australian botanist Kevin Francis Kenneally (born 1945).

== Geographic range ==
D. kenneallyi is found in the state of Western Australia.

== Reproduction ==
D. kenneallyi is oviparous.

== Taxonomy ==
D. kenneallyi belongs to the D. conspicillatus species group.
