= Eastern Deserts fat-tailed gecko =

Conservation status
- Least Concern (IUCN 3.1)

Scientific classification
- Kingdom: Animalia
- Phylum: Chordata
- Class: Reptilia
- Order: Squamata
- Suborder: Gekkota
- Family: Diplodactylidae
- Genus: Diplodactylus
- Species: D. ameyi

Binomial name
- Diplodactylus ameyi Couper & P. Oliver, 2016

Species of lizard

The eastern deserts fat-tailed gecko (Diplodactylus ameyi) is a small terrestrial species of gecko in the family Diplodactylidae. The species is endemic to Australia.

== Taxonomy ==
D. ameyi is a species in the Diplodactylus genus of geckos. This genus contains 26 recognised species of geckos covering a wide distribution, which spans much of Australia. The eastern deserts fat-tailed gecko was formerly referred to as Diplodactylus platyurus, but was recognised as a separate species in 2016. The gecko was named after Dr. Andrew Amey, for his contributions to promoting the Queensland Museum's reptile and amphibian collections as well as documenting many of Australia's native fauna.

== Description ==
=== Appearance ===
The eastern deserts fat-tailed gecko is distinguished from other Diplodactylus species by its large size of 53–90 mm (2.1–3.5 in) snout-to-vent length (SVL). It also has a bulbous tail, small and granular first labial scales (not enlarged), and has no well defined canthus rostralis. Its snout appears broad and U-shaped from above unlike others within the genus. The tail of D. ameyi is short and thick with a blunt spade-like shape. The body can range in colour from shades of brown to a light sandy colour. Spots tend to appear on the body in an irregular pattern and can also range in colour from orange to a light sandy colour. Although the spots are irregular in pattern, darker pigment is often diluted on the dorsal vertebral zone and marked with irregular patches.

=== Diet ===
This species is a specialised termite eater, although one specimen was found to also have been eating Iridomyrmex ants.

=== Reproduction ===
The eastern deserts fat-tailed gecko is an oviparous species, meaning it lays eggs and generally has a clutch size of two.

== Distribution and habitat ==
=== Distribution ===
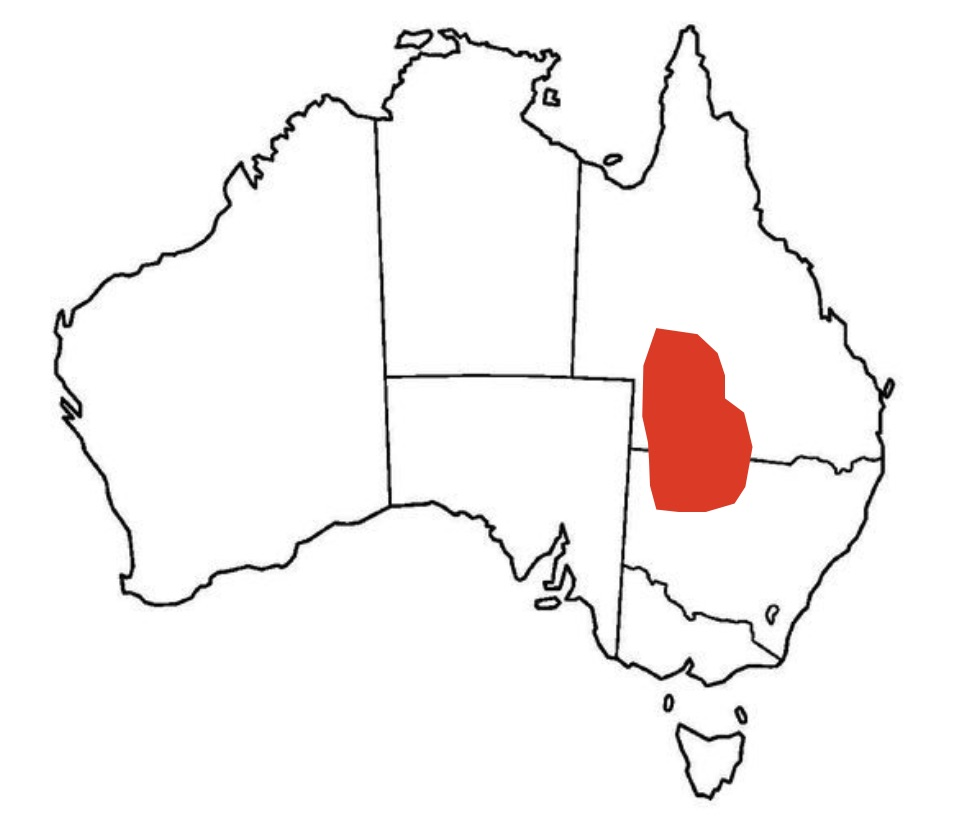
Australian Distribution

The distribution of D. ameyi is not fully known due to limited surveying of the species, although it has been recognised in North-West New South Wales and South-Western Queensland. The geckos range from North-West Wales up to the Winton area of Queensland, and to the Eastern side of the Eromanga Basin.

=== Habitat ===
The gecko can be found in the Mulga Land and Channel Country bioregions. The Channel Country is associated with Arid Shrublands (Acacia sub-formation and Chenopod sub-formation) as well as freshwater wetlands, semi-arid flood plain grasslands and woodlands. Particular Channel Country which the gecko can be found includes More Ranges and the Sturt Stony Desert. The Mulga Lands are also associated with similar habitat types (although different vegetation) but is associated with the Cuttaburra-Paroo, Urisino Sandplains and White Cliffs Plateau areas. The gecko is also found within areas of soft soil in the Chenopod Shrublands. Soft soils allow for the Eastern Deserts fat-tailed gecko to burrow and also dig for termites. These bioregions are associated with being an arid habitat, often containing sand, clay and stony substrates.

== Threats ==
The eastern deserts fat-tailed gecko is at risk from a variety of threats. Due to the soft soils and arid areas it lives in, its habitat is particularly prone to compaction from hoofed animals such as cattle and horses. This is especially true where stock aggregate close to waterways and the soil is less stable. Overgrazing by feral and domestic stock can also damage the ecosystems which they inhabit. There is also a lack of knowledge on the eastern deserts fat-tailed gecko due to it being a newly described species, and the small discrete nature of it. This lack of knowledge means that many threats, as well as effective management strategies, are likely unknown.

== Conservation ==
There are not a lot of direct conservation procedures for the eastern deserts fat-tailed gecko although there are conservation plans in place and some already underway. Identification of key management sites for the eastern deserts fat-tailed gecko is one method of conservation the New South Wales government is taking. Firstly, baseline surveys of the species need to be thoroughly conducted so that all known populations can be appropriately managed and monitored. The Saving Our Species program is leading a cost-effective approach to maximise the number of species and ecological communities that can be conserved through on-site management strategies, including surveying techniques. They plan to implement a staged survey based on historical data, then if the species is detected, expand the survey area. Also, assessment of the current ecosystem conditions, predators in the area and domestic or feral grazers in potential management sites will be performed.
