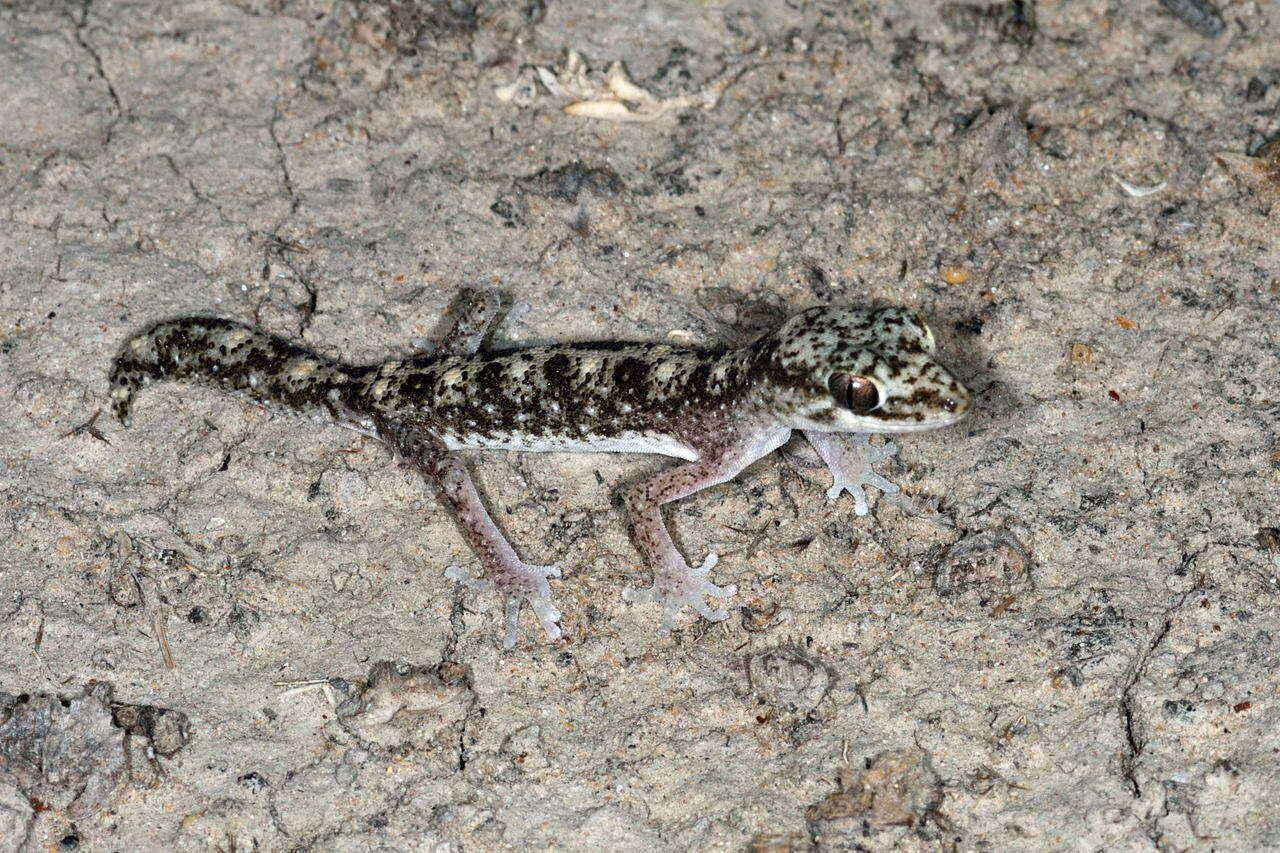

Conservation status
- Least Concern (IUCN 3.1)

Scientific classification
- Kingdom: Animalia
- Phylum: Chordata
- Class: Reptilia
- Order: Squamata
- Suborder: Gekkota
- Family: Diplodactylidae
- Genus: Diplodactylus
- Species: D. tessellatus

Binomial name
- Diplodactylus tessellatus (Günther, 1875)

= Diplodactylus tessellatus =

Species of lizard

Diplodactylus tessellatus, commonly known as the tessellated gecko, is a small terrestrial lizard found distributed in inland New South Wales, Queensland, Northern Territory, South Australia and the north western corner of Victoria. The tessellated gecko is one of 26 species in the genus Diplodactylus all of which are confined to continental Australia. A small gecko varying in colour from grey to rich reddish-brown with a highly variable dorsal pattern.

== Taxonomy and phylogeny ==
The tessellated gecko was first described by a German-born British zoologist, ichthyologist, and herpetologist Albert Gunther in 1875. Diplodactylus tessellates is a species of geckos of the genus Diplodactylus within the family Diplodactylidae. Australian diplodactyline geckos are the only extant squamate group thought to have been in Australia before its separation from other east Gondwanan landmasses. D. tessellatus is thought to have speciated from Diplodactylus vittatus between 12 and 20 million years ago during the Miocene Epoch of the Neogene period. A sister taxon relationship between D. galeatus and D. tessellatus is supported.

== Description ==
=== Morphology ===
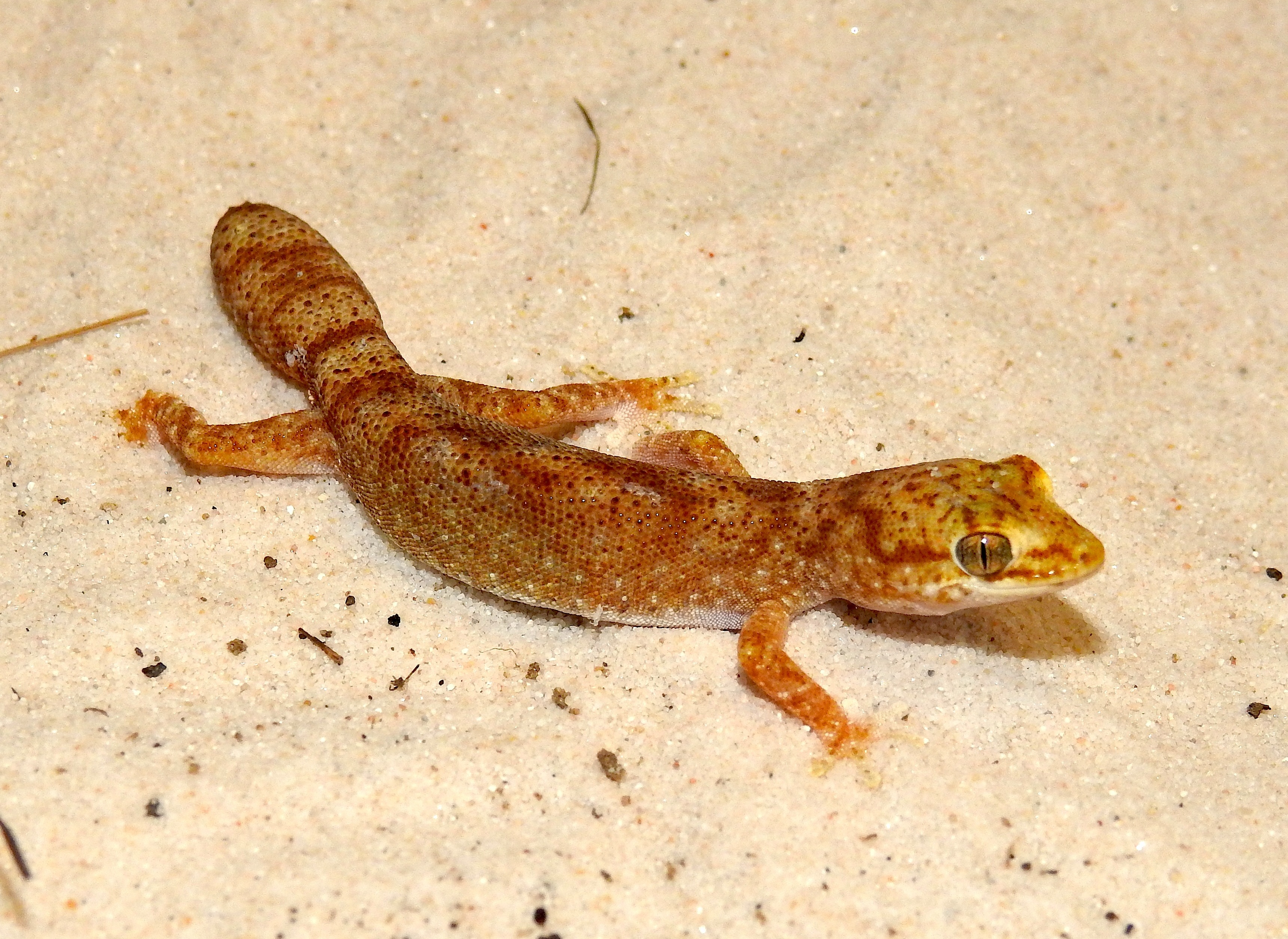
Adult D. tessellatus

With an average adult length of 9 cm in length, the tessellated gecko has a moderate body a short fleshy tail with enlarged conical scales in rings. Their body colours are varied from pale greys to rich reds with a highly variable pattern. Along the mid-dorsal region of the body and tail there is often irregular serious of pale yellow or blackish spots that are often in pairs. Pre-anal pores are absent with 4–13 post-anal tubercles. A trait common in other species of the genus Diplodactylus is the possession of slightly depressed, narrow long digits. Near the hind limb, males have a unique paracloacal spur positioned near the top of the hemipenal bulge. Hatchlings are often brighter and around 25–30% the average adult size.

=== Population & Ecology ===
In Kinchega National Park from 1985 to 1987 the life history and population ecology of the tessellated gecko was studied by Klaus Henle. The studies produced data showing there were short peaks of high mortality in spring or summer and low mortalities for the rest of the year, especially in winter when they are restricted or inactive. Dispersal ranges for individuals are from 50 to 100 meters from their birth site. They are most active from the spring months of September through to the end of May before hibernating during winter.

== Habitat and distribution ==
A terrestrial gecko that is widely distributed throughout the drier reaching interiors of New South Wales, Queensland, Northern Territory, South Australia and Victoria. During the day it may be found resting in habitats such as ground cracks, abandoned spider holes, crevices, under debris or fallen timber which all provide a camouflage from predation. Emerges at night to feed on insects. Can be quiet abundant in the right conditions such as black soiled flood plains of larger inland rivers.

== Diet ==
Being an arthropod food generalist, the main diet consists of species of the Orthoptera order (crickets and grass hoppers), spiders and Diptera species, with a favourite delicacy of termites. While widely foraging, D. tessellatus is a sit-and-wait predator often sitting at the same spot for hours. Before breeding and hibernation in winter, food intake will increase to help produce fat storage.

== Breeding ==
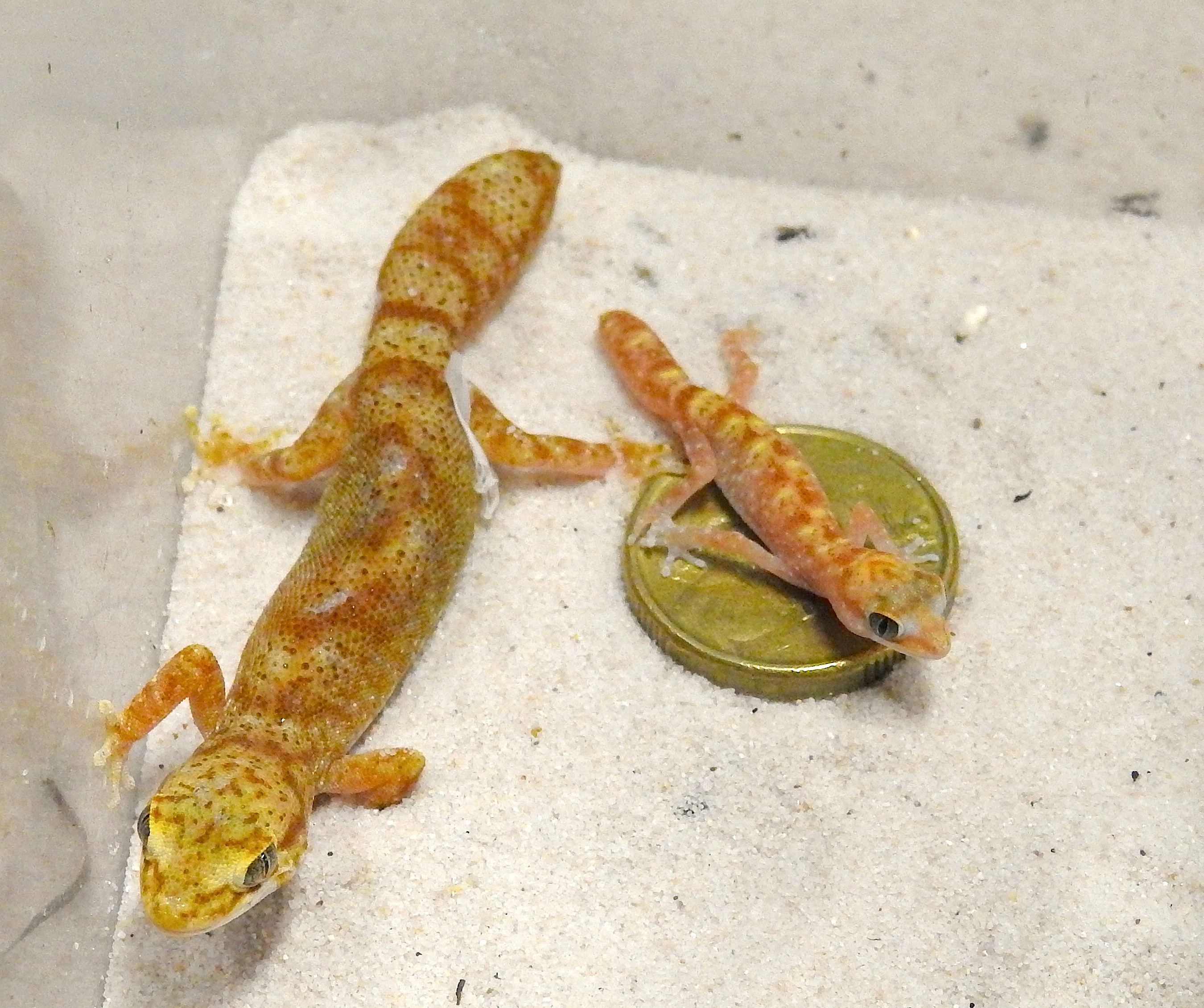
Adult D. tessellatus in comparative to a hatchling

The tessellated gecko will on average produce clutches of 2 eggs with an incubation period of around 50–60 days if under the right temperature conditions of around 28 degrees. The eggs average size is 13.5 mm long and 6.5 mm wide. The hatchlings average size is around 24 mm in total length and reach sexual maturity at one year old. Under favourable phenological conditions such as abundant food availability and stable climate, a healthy female can produce up to two clutches without any detrimental harm to her own fitness. In natural conditions the first clutch will be laid in November and the second in January with an observed egg mortality rate of 56%. Oviductal eggs can be detected by using the palpation method.

== Threats ==
=== Introduced species ===
In Australia introduced species have caused the greatest number of extinctions. Exotic feral animals such as cats can have a negative effect on terrestrial geckos with mortality rates often correlating with predation at night. Ground foraging species such as D. tessellatus can often fall prey to an unsuspecting cat that has adapted to its environment.
