= Diplodactylus calcicolus =

Conservation status
- Least Concern (IUCN 3.1)

Scientific classification
- Kingdom: Animalia
- Phylum: Chordata
- Class: Reptilia
- Order: Squamata
- Suborder: Gekkota
- Family: Diplodactylidae
- Genus: Diplodactylus
- Species: D. calcicolus

Binomial name
- Diplodactylus calcicolus Hutchinson, Doughty, & P. Oliver, 2009

Species of lizard

Diplodactylus calcicolus, sometimes called the south coast gecko, is a gecko endemic to Australia.

== Description ==
D. calcicolus is a gecko with a medium size that usually has a very broken and spotted pattern along the length of the body that has considerable variation among the population. It is a longer tailed member of the Diplodactylus vittatus complex. There are markings with spots of various sizes along the flanks with a dorsum that is variegated by a mix of lighter and darker scales.

It is a terrestrial, nocturnal species that is often found on open ground at night when it is active. During the day when it is less active it is prefers to shelter under rocks and fallen logs and among leaf litter and also in calcareous coastal sands.

== Distribution ==
The gecko has a stable population inhabiting a variety of arid and semi-arid desert and shrubland communities in the southern Wheatbelt and along the south coast of the Western Australia and Goldfields-Esperance regions of Western Australia and along the south coast of South Australia west from the Eyre Peninsula with isolated populations east of Adelaide and the southern part of the Yorke Peninsula.
