= Diplodactylus mitchelli =

Conservation status
- Least Concern (IUCN 3.1)

Scientific classification
- Kingdom: Animalia
- Phylum: Chordata
- Class: Reptilia
- Order: Squamata
- Suborder: Gekkota
- Family: Diplodactylidae
- Genus: Diplodactylus
- Species: D. mitchelli

Binomial name
- Diplodactylus mitchelli Kluge, 1963

Species of lizard

Diplodactylus mitchelli, sometimes called commonly the Pilbara stone gecko, is a species of lizard in the family Diplodactylidae. The species is endemic to Australia.

== Etymology ==
The specific name, mitchelli, is in honor of Australian herpetologist Francis John Mitchell.

== Description ==
As an adult, Diplodactylus mitchelli has an average snout-to-vent length (SVL) of 6.4 cm (2.5 in). Dorsally, it is brown or reddish brown, with a paler vertebral stripe.

== Geographic distribution ==
Diplodactylus mitchelli is found in the North West Cape and Pilbara regions of Western Australia.

== Habitat ==
The preferred natural habitat of Diplodactylus mitchelli is grassland.

== Reproduction ==
Diplodactylus mitchelli is oviparous

== Taxonomy ==
Diplodactylus mitchelli is a member of the Diplodactylus vittatus species group.
