= Mitchelli =

Mitchelli may refer to:

- D. mitchellii
  - Diplodactylus mitchelli, a gecko species in the genus Diplodactylus
- E. mitchelli
  - Enaliarctos mitchelli, an extinct pinniped species in the genus Enaliarctos
- M. mitchelli
  - Modisimus mitchelli, Gertsch, 1971, a spider species Modisimus and the family Pholcidae found in Mexico
- O. mitchelli
  - Oonops mitchelli, Gertsch, 1977, a spider species in the genus Oonops found in Mexico
- S. mitchelli
  - Sabacon mitchelli, a harvestman species in the genus Sabacon
- T. mitchelli
  - Tipula mitchelli, Edwards, 1927, a crane fly species in the genus Tipula

== Subspecies ==
- Dipodomys merriami mitchelli, a subspecies in the species Dipodomys merriami, the Merriam's kangaroo rat, a rodent species
- Pogona minor mitchelli, a subspecies in the agamid lizard species Pogona minor found in Western Australia

== See also ==
- Mitchell (disambiguation)
