= Diplodactylus granariensis =

Conservation status
- Least Concern (IUCN 3.1)

Scientific classification
- Kingdom: Animalia
- Phylum: Chordata
- Class: Reptilia
- Order: Squamata
- Suborder: Gekkota
- Family: Diplodactylidae
- Genus: Diplodactylus
- Species: D. granariensis

Binomial name
- Diplodactylus granariensis Storr, 1979

Species of lizard

Diplodactylus granariensis, sometimes called the western stone gecko, wheat-belt stone gecko, or the giant stone gecko, is a gecko endemic to Australia.
