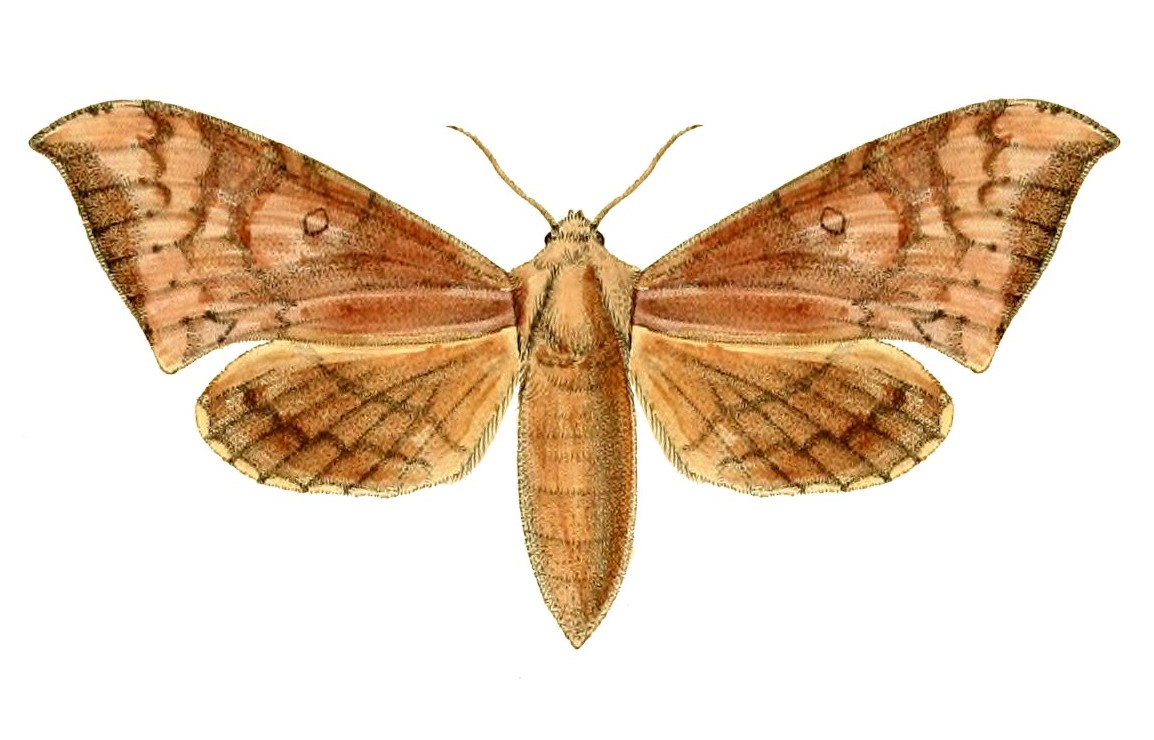

Scientific classification
- Domain: Eukaryota
- Kingdom: Animalia
- Phylum: Arthropoda
- Class: Insecta
- Order: Lepidoptera
- Family: Sphingidae
- Genus: Andriasa
- Species: A. contraria

Binomial name
- Andriasa contraria Walker, 1856

Synonyms
- Polyptychus contraria; Baniana submarginalis Walker, [1865]; Andriasa suffusa (Walker, 1869); Andriasa adansoniae (Boisduval, [1875]); Andriasa pechuelii (Dewitz, 1879); Dewitzia perpallida Holland, 1893; Dewitzia crenulata (Bethune-Baker, 1911); Dewitzia objectus (Strand, 1912); Dewitzia towadeus (Gehlen, 1935); Dewitzia stigmaticus (Gehlen, 1940)

= Andriasa contraria =

Species of moth

Andriasa contraria is a moth of the family Sphingidae. It is known from tropical Africa, including Kenya, Cameroon and South Africa. It is a very variable species and is common in all habitats except deserts and high mountains.

The length of the forewings is 25–31 mm for males.

The larvae have been recorded feeding on the leaves of Spathodea campanulata. Other recorded food plants include Newboldia and Markhamia species.

== Subspecies ==
- Andriasa contraria contraria (South Africa to Tanzania, East Africa and Ethiopia)
- Andriasa contraria diffusus (Rothschild & Jordan, 1910) (Eritrea)
- Andriasa contraria submarginalis (Walker, 1865) (West Africa to the Congo, Uganda and west Kenya)
- Andriasa contraria suffusa (Walker, 1869) (Cameroon)
