= Diplodactylus nebulosus =

Conservation status
- Least Concern (IUCN 3.1)

Scientific classification
- Kingdom: Animalia
- Phylum: Chordata
- Order: Squamata
- Suborder: Gekkota
- Family: Diplodactylidae
- Genus: Diplodactylus
- Species: D. nebulosus

Binomial name
- Diplodactylus nebulosus Doughty & P. Oliver, 2013

Species of lizard

Diplodactylus nebulosus is a species of geckos endemic to Australia.
