= Diplodactylus wiru =

Conservation status
- Least Concern (IUCN 3.1)

Scientific classification
- Kingdom: Animalia
- Phylum: Chordata
- Class: Reptilia
- Order: Squamata
- Suborder: Gekkota
- Family: Diplodactylidae
- Genus: Diplodactylus
- Species: D. wiru

Binomial name
- Diplodactylus wiru Hutchinson, Doughty, & P. Oliver, 2009

Species of lizard

Diplodactylus wiru, sometimes called the desert wood gecko, is a gecko endemic to Australia.
