= Diplodactylus capensis =

Conservation status
- Near Threatened (IUCN 3.1)

Scientific classification
- Kingdom: Animalia
- Phylum: Chordata
- Order: Squamata
- Suborder: Gekkota
- Family: Diplodactylidae
- Genus: Diplodactylus
- Species: D. capensis

Binomial name
- Diplodactylus capensis Doughty, P. Oliver, & Adams, 2008

Species of lizard

Diplodactylus capensis, sometimes called the Cape Range stone gecko, is a gecko endemic to Australia.
