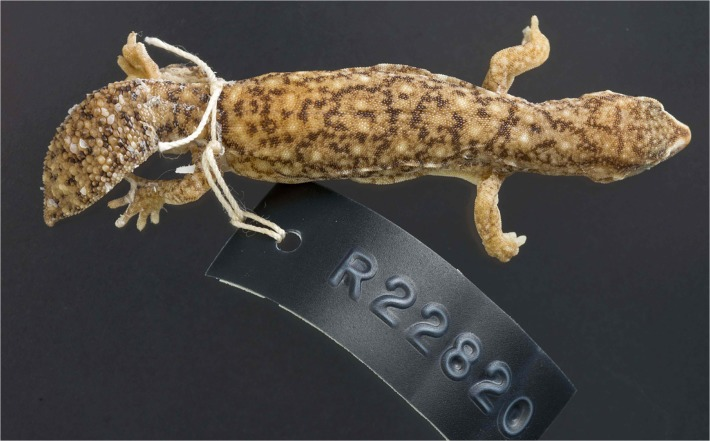

Conservation status
- Least Concern (IUCN 3.1)

Scientific classification
- Kingdom: Animalia
- Phylum: Chordata
- Class: Reptilia
- Order: Squamata
- Suborder: Gekkota
- Family: Diplodactylidae
- Genus: Diplodactylus
- Species: D. bilybara

Binomial name
- Diplodactylus bilybara Couper, P. Oliver & Pepper, 2014

= Diplodactylus bilybara =

Species of lizard

Diplodactylus bilybara, sometimes called the western fat-tailed gecko, is a gecko endemic to Australia. This gecko can be found in Western Australia along the central west coast. The species average length is 6.3 cm or 2.48 inches. These are generally reddish brown or grey. Their reproduction is oviparous.
