= Diplodactylus fulleri =

Conservation status
- Vulnerable (IUCN 3.1)

Scientific classification
- Kingdom: Animalia
- Phylum: Chordata
- Class: Reptilia
- Order: Squamata
- Suborder: Gekkota
- Family: Diplodactylidae
- Genus: Diplodactylus
- Species: D. fulleri

Binomial name
- Diplodactylus fulleri Storr, 1978

Species of lizard

Diplodactylus fulleri, sometimes called the Lake Disappointment ground gecko, is a species of gecko, a lizard in the family Diplodactylidae. The species is endemic to Australia.

== Etymology ==
The specific name, fulleri, is in honor of Australian ornithologist Phillip John Fuller.

== Geographic range ==
D. fulleri is found in Western Australia in the vicinity of Kumpupintil Lake (formerly Lake Disappointment). The type locality given by Storr is "5 km W of the mouth of Savoury Creek".

== Habitat ==
The preferred natural habitat of D. fulleri is shrubs near the salt lake.

== Reproduction ==
D. fulleri is oviparous.
