= Diplodactylus ornatus =

Conservation status
- Least Concern (IUCN 3.1)

Scientific classification
- Kingdom: Animalia
- Phylum: Chordata
- Class: Reptilia
- Order: Squamata
- Suborder: Gekkota
- Family: Diplodactylidae
- Genus: Diplodactylus
- Species: D. ornatus

Binomial name
- Diplodactylus ornatus Gray, 1845

Species of lizard

Diplodactylus ornatus, sometimes called the ornate stone gecko, is a gecko endemic to Australia.
