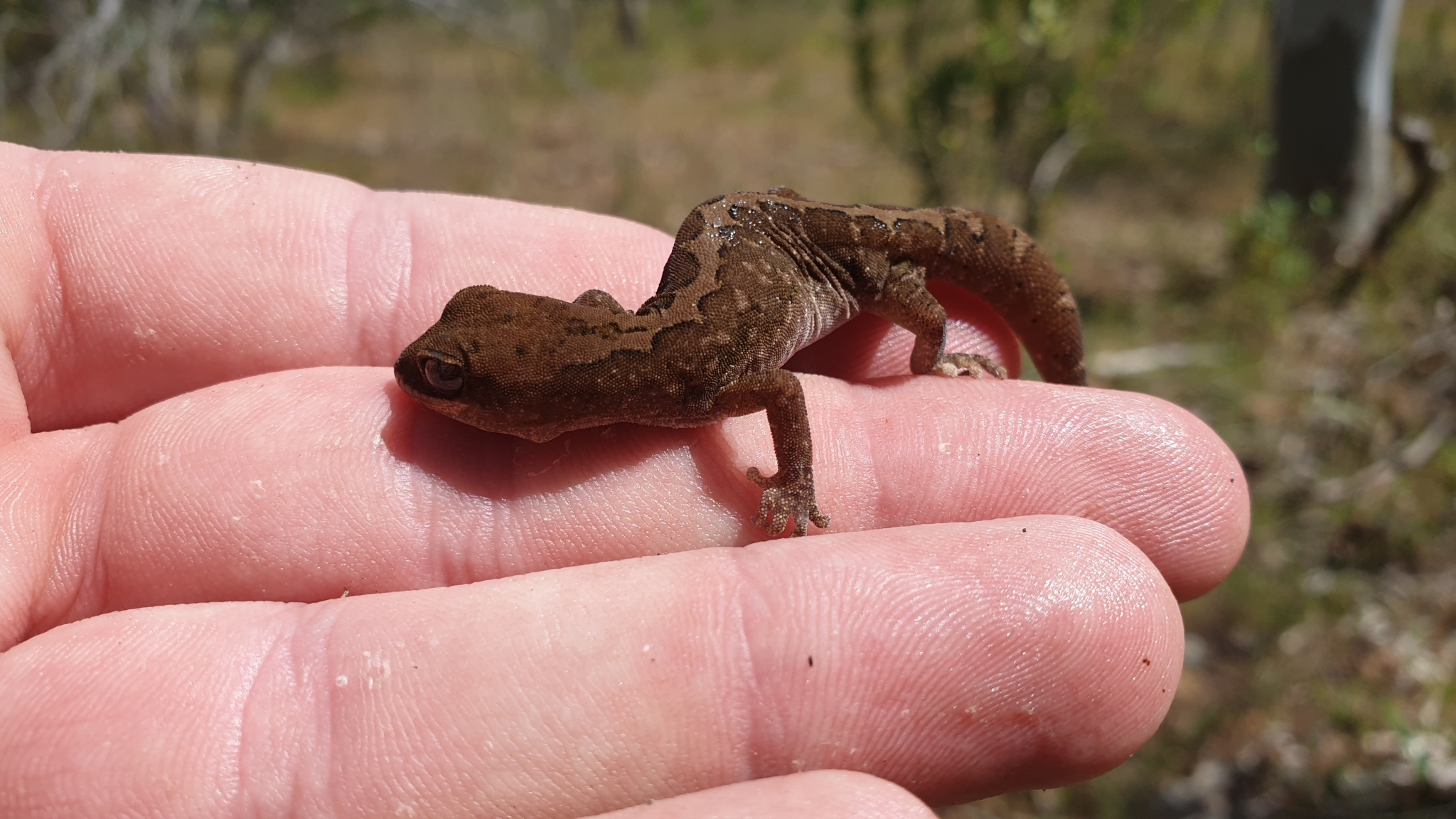

Conservation status
- Least Concern (IUCN 3.1)

Scientific classification
- Kingdom: Animalia
- Phylum: Chordata
- Class: Reptilia
- Order: Squamata
- Suborder: Gekkota
- Family: Diplodactylidae
- Genus: Diplodactylus
- Species: D. furcosus

Binomial name
- Diplodactylus furcosus Peters, 1863

= Diplodactylus furcosus =

Species of lizard

Diplodactylus furcosus, sometimes called the Ranges stone gecko or forked gecko, is a gecko endemic to Australia.
