= Joan Beauchamp Procter =

British zoologist (1897–1931)

Joan Procter
- Born: Joan Beauchamp Procter; 5 August 1897; 11, Kensington Square, London, England
- Died: 20 September 1931 (aged 34); St Mark's House, St Mark's Square, London
- Known for: Extensive taxonomic work on reptiles and amphibians; Pioneering work in care and display of zoo animals; Early research on Komodo dragons in captivity
- Awards: Honorary Doctor of Science (1931), University of Chicago
- Scientific career
- Fields: Herpetology
- Institutions: British Museum (Natural History); Zoological Society of London
- Academic advisors: George Albert Boulenger; Edward George Boulenger; Peter Chalmers Mitchell

Joan Beauchamp Procter FZS FLS (5 August 1897 – 20 September 1931) was a notable British zoologist, internationally recognised as an outstanding herpetologist. She worked initially at the British Museum (Natural History) and later for the Zoological Society of London as the first female Curator of Reptiles at London Zoo. Her short life was afflicted by chronic ill-health, but she undertook substantial taxonomic work and made significant innovative contributions to veterinary practice and zoo displays. She also wrote scientific and popular zoological articles, including early accounts of the behaviour of captive Komodo dragons.

== Early life ==
Joan Procter was born in London on 5 August 1897, at 11 Kensington Square, the daughter of Joseph Procter, a stockbroker, and Elizabeth Procter (née Brockbank), an artist. Her grandfather William Brockbank was a lover of art and also an amateur botanist and geologist. Family interests in the arts and sciences influenced both Joan and her sister Chrystabel Prudence Goldsmith Procter (1894–1982). The family homes had large gardens, which facilitated the sisters’ childhood pursuits in natural history. Christabel became Estate Manager at Bryanston School in Dorset and Garden Steward at Girton College, Cambridge.

While still at Norland Place School (1904–1908), Joan Procter developed a special interest in amphibians and reptiles. She became familiar with all the British species of reptile, and from the age of ten she kept several snakes and lizards as pets. A large Dalmatian lizard was a special pet, which travelled everywhere with her and sat on the table beside her at mealtimes. She was a sickly child, but, as a twelve-year-old, she spent an active six months in Switzerland enjoying dancing, tobogganing, and botany. This was the only time when she was relatively free of the chronic intestinal illness that afflicted her throughout the rest of her life.

Her fascination with reptiles developed further during her time at St Paul's Girls' School, Hammersmith (1908–1916). When she was sixteen, she acquired a young crocodile as a pet and took it with her to school, resulting in consternation in a mathematics lesson. She was said to be a "brilliant" student, but her education was frequently interrupted because of chronic ill-health. Although she showed great promise, illness led to her abandoning the idea of going to Cambridge University.

== The British Museum (Natural History) ==
Joan Procter's enquiries about reptiles brought her to the attention of George Albert Boulenger, then Keeper of Reptiles and Fishes at the British Museum (Natural History) and he encouraged her interest. When she left school, Boulenger invited her to work under his direction and in 1916 she became his assistant, working at the museum in South Kensington in a voluntary capacity. Mentored by him, she was able to engage in academic zoology although she lacked university qualifications. At the age of nineteen, she presented her first scientific paper to the Zoological Society of London (ZSL) on variations of a Central and South American species of pit viper and in August 1917 she was elected as a Fellow of the Zoological Society (FZS). When Boulenger retired in 1920, she took sole charge of reptiles at the museum and received a small stipend for her work

Between 1917 and 1923 she conducted research and wrote a series of scientific papers on the anatomy, classification and habits of reptiles and amphibians. Notable amongst these is her study of an East African tortoise, now known as Malacochersus tornieri, which is able to conceal itself in rock crevices because of its flexible carapace. In 1923, William Bateson sought her support for his critique of Paul Kammerer’s controversial work on the midwife toad (Alytes). Although Procter was "not averse to war with Kammerer", she believed there was insufficient material to assist Bateson on this issue.

Procter corresponded widely, establishing her reputation with scientists around the world, and formally described many animals collected by others. She was elected as a Fellow of the Linnean Society of London (FLS) in recognition of the high quality of this taxonomic work. She also became a member of the Bombay Natural History Society. Joan Procter was also an accomplished draughtswoman and modeller. She made models for display cases at the museum and combined her artistic flair with scientific accuracy in a series of paintings of amphibians and reptiles that were reproduced in colour as postcards.

== Zoological Society of London ==
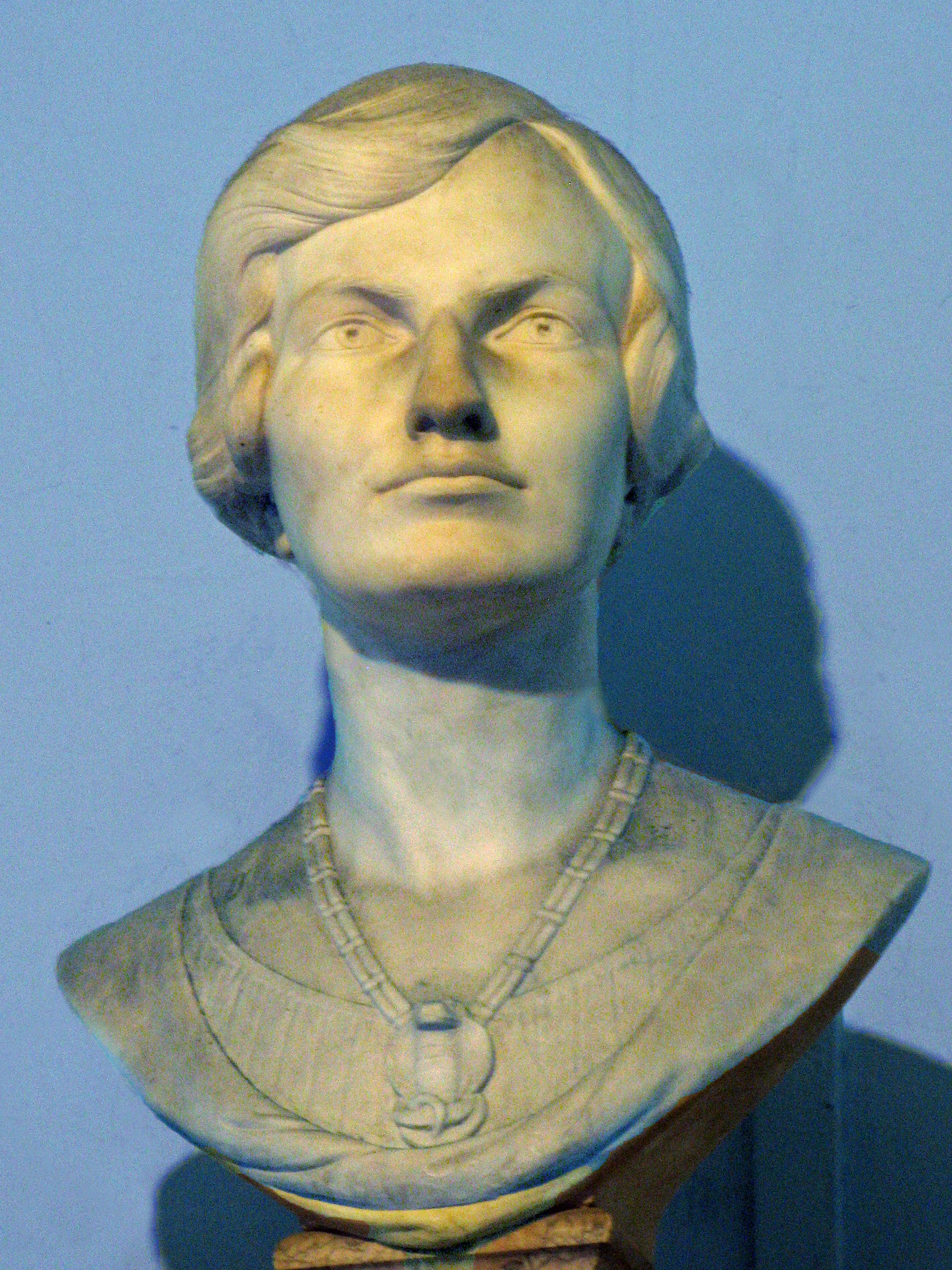
Marble bust of Joan Beauchamp Procter, sculpted by George Alexander (1931), on display in the Reptile House at London Zoo

Joan Procter's artistic and technical abilities became known within the Zoological Society, mainly through her friendship with George Boulenger's son, Edward G. Boulenger, who had been the society's Curator of Reptiles since 1911. By early 1923 he had responsibility for developing the new Aquarium at London Zoo and, although she was still employed at the British Museum (Natural History), Procter assisted him for several months, by building scale models of the new aquarium tanks and applying her artistry to designs for their rock-work and backgrounds. She met Sir Compton Mackenzie, who provided large quantities of shell sand for the Aquarium from the Channel Island of Herm. Later that year, Edward Boulenger was appointed as Director of the Aquarium and Joan Procter was appointed his successor as Curator of Reptiles. In correspondence with Karl Patterson Schmidt in Chicago, Procter confided that she was pleased to leave the Natural History Museum because conditions there were unfavourable to women.

=== Design work at London Zoo ===
Following her success with the aquarium, she designed rockwork for outdoor areas at the Zoo, including the Antelope Paddock. She made models of the extensive rock structures for Monkey Hill (1924–1925) which was built on the site of the present Animal Hospital. The large troop of hamadryas baboons established there proved very popular with visitors and, in Joan Procter's lifetime, Monkey Hill was considered a success. The social dynamics of the baboons later became too problematic to resolve; the hill was then used for goats, and briefly for rhesus macaques, before being closed and demolished shortly after the Second World War.

Lasting success was achieved by Joan Procter's design for the Reptile House (built 1926–1927). It was the first purpose-built building of its type in the world and is still in use. She designed rockwork and pools for the reptile enclosures and a theatrical scenic artist, John Bull, was employed to execute her designs for naturalistic back-scenes. Although external Italianate features were added by the architect Sir Edward Guy Dawber, the basic structure, floor plan and exhibit details of the Reptile House were entirely the work of Joan Procter. Peter Chalmers Mitchell, then Secretary of the Zoological Society, recorded that "from the beginning to the end it was her house". It incorporated many of Procter's new technological ideas. It pioneered the use of 'Vita-glass', which allowed natural ultraviolet light, needed by reptiles for the synthesis of Vitamin D, to reach the animals and several of other sophisticated features (such as the directional circulation of visitors, differential electrical heating of enclosures, and aquarium principle lighting) that were subsequently adopted in other zoo buildings. Later, she collaborated with Peter Chalmers Mitchell on the design brief for the Main Gate (1928), which is also attributed to Sir Edward Guy Dawber. It remains in use, largely unaltered.

=== Handling dangerous animals ===
Joan Procter became expert in the routine handling of animals such as large pythons, crocodilians and Komodo dragons. The first two live Komodo dragons to arrive in Europe were exhibited in the Reptile House at London Zoo when it opened in 1927. She established an extraordinary rapport with these animals, demonstrating that their behaviour in captivity could be contrary to their popular image as dangerous predators. She was well aware that "they could no doubt kill one if they wished, or give a terrible bite", but good care, feeding and routine handling resulted in dragons described "as tame as dogs and even seem to show affection". The dragon named Sumbawa became Joan Procter's particular pet and accompanied her when she walked around the Zoo; often she ‘steered’ it by holding the tail. It was tame with visitors, including young children; a photograph in one of her published articles shows Sumbawa next to a two-year-old child who appears to be patting the reptile on its head. In 1928, she demonstrated this animal at a Scientific Meeting of the Zoological Society, feeding it chicken, eggs and a pigeon by hand while she stroked and patted it.

She worked closely with the Zoological Society's pathologist to identify diseases and became expert at treating sick animals, although sometimes she needed assistance: A Komodo dragon "required three strong keepers to hold it while she opened its mouth". Using special equipment of her own design, she successfully carried out a range of veterinary procedures many of which "had not hitherto been attempted".

== National and international recognition ==
As the first female Curator of Reptiles at London Zoo, Joan Procter attained considerable celebrity status in a short time. At her home in St. Mark's Square, near the Zoo, she kept a pet chimpanzee, called Johnnie. She kept several live reptiles in her drawing room, including dangerous snakes (in glass enclosures). The image of an unusually interesting young woman responsible for exotic and dangerous animals was promoted in the popular press on both Britain and the United States.

Joan Procter published widely in scientific books and journals. She also wrote popular accounts, particularly in J. A. Hammerton’s Wonders of Animal Life. Through her publications and correspondence with other scientists she became internationally recognised as a leading herpetologist and on 28 March 1931 she was awarded an honorary doctorate, Doctor of Science (DSC), by the University of Chicago, in recognition of her achievements.

== Ill health and early death ==
Chronic ill-health persisted throughout Joan Procter’s adult life and she underwent several surgical operations. She displayed great determination and good humour, but all of her achievements were accomplished against a background of constant pain. In 1928, after five years of intensive activity at London Zoo, serious illness prevented further work and she decided to resign from her post. Herbrand Russell, 11th Duke of Bedford, as President of the Zoological Society, refused to accept her resignation. In 1928, Peter Chalmers Mitchell involved her in planning for the new zoological park that was then being developed at Whipsnade and he sent her to stay there, at Hall Farm, while she was recuperating from her illness. Every morning she rode on a donkey or a pony from Hall Farm to the edge of the Downs. The track she followed still exists within Whipsnade Zoo, named in her memory, as "Miss Joan’s Ride".

Joan Procter's involvement with large, potentially dangerous animals continued in her final years. At Whipsnade she had a close encounter with an escaped brown bear, which she captured by enticing it with some honey before shutting it in a lavatory. Towards the end of her life, when she could only get around the grounds of London Zoo in an electric wheelchair, she was still often accompanied by a 3-metre-long Komodo dragon on a leash. Although seriously ill, she continued to work intermittently, painting in watercolours and planning articles for the Manchester Guardian. She died from sepsis at her home in St Mark's House, St Mark's Square, London NW1, on 20 September 1931, aged 34.

== Commemoration ==
George Alexander, who carved the reptiles on the stone architrave around the entrance to the Reptile House, later sculpted a marble bust of Joan Procter which was exhibited in 1931 at the Royal Academy of Arts in London. Subsequently presented to the Zoological Society, it is displayed with a commemorative bronze plaque at the entrance to the Reptile House at London Zoo. Alexander's carved reptiles are said to have "satisfied Miss Procter’s meticulous desire for scientific accuracy as well as artistic beauty" and the bust evidently meets similar criteria, being described as "the best likeness of her".

For International Women's Day in 2014 the Zoological Society of London celebrated the achievements of Joan Procter, also publishing a picture of Joan Procter and of one of her tame Komodo dragons on its website.

In 2026, British artist Linder unveiled Sirona, a permanent 16-metre (53 ft) marble and granite mosaic at London Zoo honouring Procter as part of the bicentenary of the Zoological Society of London (ZSL). The artwork, depicting an Ethiopian mountain adder, is Linder's first permanent public artwork and first mosaic.

Two species of reptiles have been named in honour of Joan Procter: a snake, Buhoma procterae (genus Buhoma, formerly Geodipsas procterae); and a tortoise, Testudo procterae (synonym of Kinixys spekii ).
