= Diplodactylus galaxias =

Conservation status
- Least Concern (IUCN 3.1)

Scientific classification
- Kingdom: Animalia
- Phylum: Chordata
- Class: Reptilia
- Order: Squamata
- Suborder: Gekkota
- Family: Diplodactylidae
- Genus: Diplodactylus
- Species: D. galaxias

Binomial name
- Diplodactylus galaxias Doughty, Pepper, & Keogh, 2010

Species of lizard

Diplodactylus galaxias, sometimes called the Northern Pilbara beak-faced gecko, is a gecko endemic to Australia.
