= Diplodactylus polyophthalmus =

Conservation status
- Vulnerable (IUCN 3.1)

Scientific classification
- Kingdom: Animalia
- Phylum: Chordata
- Class: Reptilia
- Order: Squamata
- Suborder: Gekkota
- Family: Diplodactylidae
- Genus: Diplodactylus
- Species: D. polyophthalmus

Binomial name
- Diplodactylus polyophthalmus Günther, 1867

Species of lizard

Diplodactylus polyophthalmus, sometimes called the spotted sandplain gecko, is a gecko endemic to Australia.
