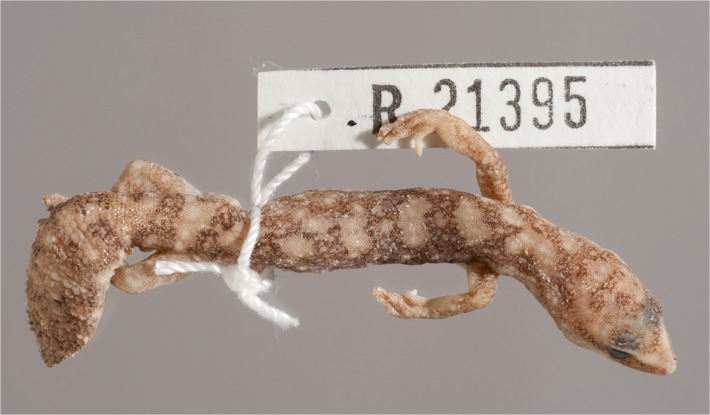

Conservation status
- Least Concern (IUCN 3.1)

Scientific classification
- Kingdom: Animalia
- Phylum: Chordata
- Class: Reptilia
- Order: Squamata
- Suborder: Gekkota
- Family: Diplodactylidae
- Genus: Diplodactylus
- Species: D. barraganae

Binomial name
- Diplodactylus barraganae Couper, P. Oliver & Pepper, 2014

= Diplodactylus barraganae =

Species of lizard

Diplodactylus barraganae, sometimes called the Gulf fat-tailed gecko, is a gecko endemic to Australia.

== Taxonomy ==
The species name honours María Elena Barragán who is an important herpetologist from Ecuador, for her contributions to reptile conservation and public education.

== Distribution ==
It is found in the Gulf Country in the border region between the Northern Territory and Queensland.
