= Diplodactylus lateroides =

Conservation status
- Least Concern (IUCN 3.1)

Scientific classification
- Kingdom: Animalia
- Phylum: Chordata
- Order: Squamata
- Suborder: Gekkota
- Family: Diplodactylidae
- Genus: Diplodactylus
- Species: D. lateroides

Binomial name
- Diplodactylus lateroides Doughty & P. Oliver, 2013

Species of lizard

Diplodactylus lateroides, sometimes called the speckled stone gecko, is a species of geckos endemic to Australia.

This species is found in Western Australia, specifically the Darling Range, a series of low rugged ranges that extend from near Perth and to the far southwest of Western Australia. The existence of an outlying population in the Stirling Range was recently confirmed.

The speckled stone gecko is terrestrial and can be found under debris, logs and rocks in forest, open woodlands, and heathlands.
