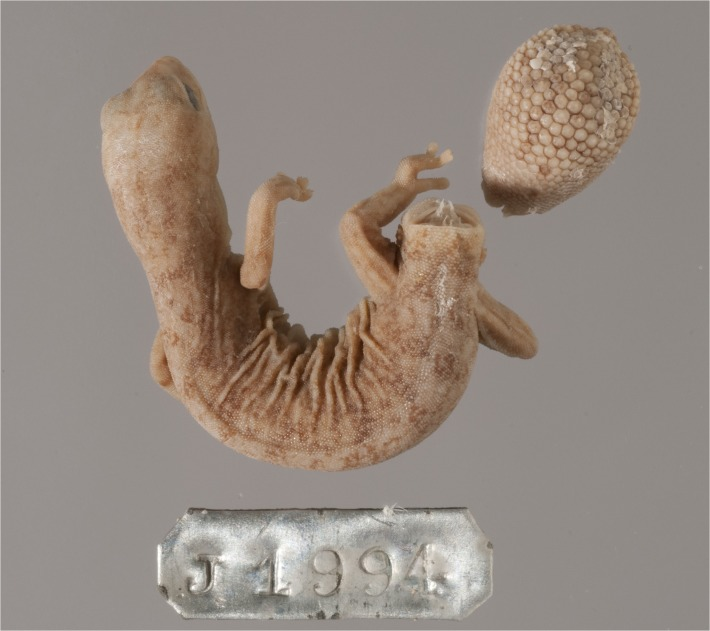

Conservation status
- Least Concern (IUCN 3.1)

Scientific classification
- Kingdom: Animalia
- Phylum: Chordata
- Class: Reptilia
- Order: Squamata
- Suborder: Gekkota
- Family: Diplodactylidae
- Genus: Diplodactylus
- Species: D. hillii

Binomial name
- Diplodactylus hillii Longman, 1915

= Diplodactylus hillii =

Species of lizard

Diplodactylus hillii, sometimes called the northern fat-tailed gecko, is a gecko endemic to Australia.
