= Dialogue with Death =

- First US edition cover
- Author: Arthur Koestler
- Translator: Trevor and Phyllis Blewitt
- Language: English
- Genre: Autobiography
- Publisher: Macmillan
- Publication date: 1942 (US)
- Pages: 215 (cloth bound)

Dialogue with Death, a book by Arthur Koestler, was originally published in 1937 as a section (Part II) of his book Spanish Testament, in which he describes his experiences during the Spanish Civil War. Part II of the book was subsequently decoupled from Spanish Testament and, with minor modifications, published on its own under the title Dialogue with Death (see quotation below). The book describes Koestler’s prison experiences under sentence of death. The book was written in the late autumn of 1937 immediately after his release from prison, when the events were still vivid in his memory.

In the second volume of his autobiography The Invisible Writing, written by Koestler fifteen years later, the following footnote appears:

In all foreign editions, including the American, Dialogue with Death appeared as a self-contained book. In the original English edition, however (Gollancz and Left Book Club, 1937), it formed the second part of Spanish Testament the first part of which consisted of the earlier propaganda book on Spain that I had written for Muenzenberg. Spanish Testament is (and shall remain) out of print; Dialogue with Death has been reissued in England under that title, in the form in which it was originally written.

== Background ==
Koestler made three trips to Spain during the civil war and on the third occasion he was captured, sentenced to death and imprisoned by the Nationalist forces of General Franco. He was at that time working on behalf of the Comintern and as an agent of the Loyalist Government's official news agency, using for cover accreditation to the British daily News Chronicle.

Koestler had taken an ill-considered decision to stay at Málaga in southern Spain when the Republican forces withdrew from it. He had only narrowly escaped arrest by Franco’s army on his previous sojourn into Nationalist territory, when on his second day in Nationalist-held Seville he was recognised by a former colleague of his from Ullstein’s in Berlin, who knew that Koestler was a Communist. This time he was less fortunate and was arrested, summarily sentenced to death and sent off to imprisonment in Seville.

The book describes Koestler's time in the prison, in the company of numerous political prisoners—most of them Spanish Republicans. Prisoners lived under the constant threat of summary execution without trial, without warning and without even any evident logic in the choice of victims. Every morning, prisoners would wake to find that some of their number had been executed during the night.

The book was written in German, except for the prison diary, which Koestler wrote in English to avoid attracting the Gestapo's attention.

== Influence on later work ==
Koestler's prison experience contributed psychological insight for his subsequent best-selling anti-totalitarian novel Darkness at Noon, published in 1941.
