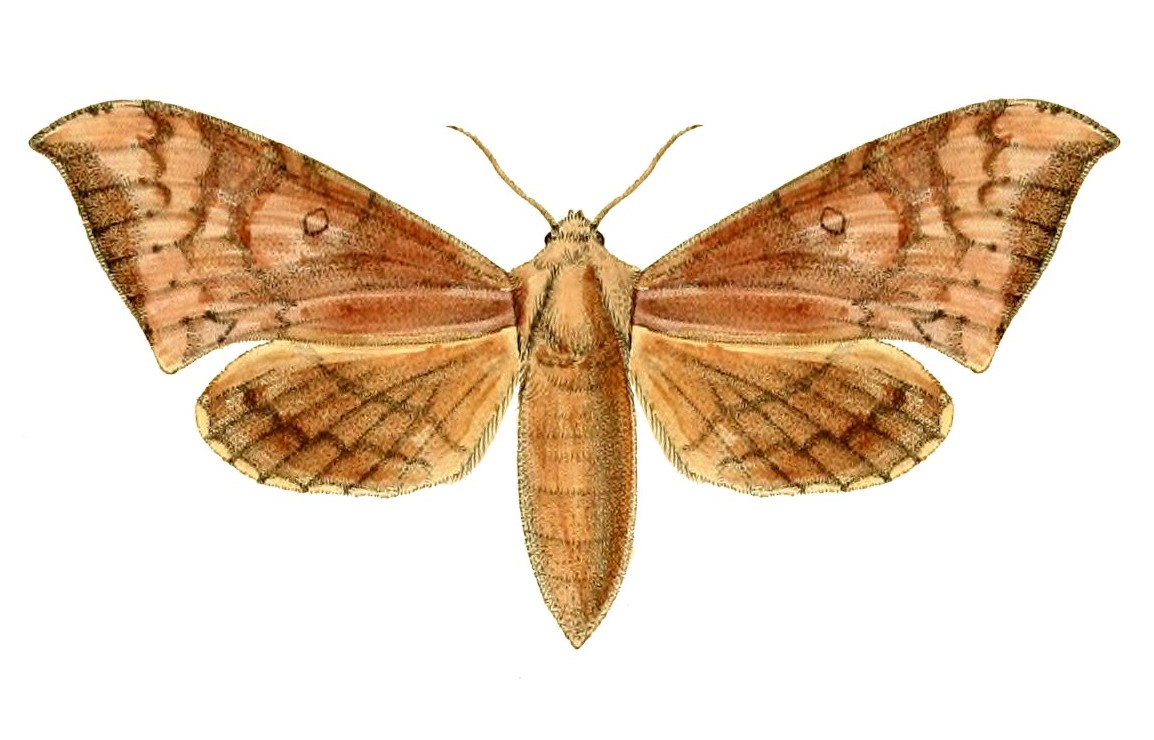
- Andriasa pechuelii

Scientific classification
- Domain: Eukaryota
- Kingdom: Animalia
- Phylum: Arthropoda
- Class: Insecta
- Order: Lepidoptera
- Family: Sphingidae
- Tribe: Smerinthini
- Genus: Andriasa; Walker, 1856

Synonyms
- Dewitzia Holland, 1889; Pseudosmerinthus Butler, 1877

= Andriasa =

Genus of moths

Andriasa is a genus of moths in the family Sphingidae first described by Francis Walker in 1856.

== Species ==
- Andriasa contraria Walker, 1856
- Andriasa mitchelli Hayes, 1973
