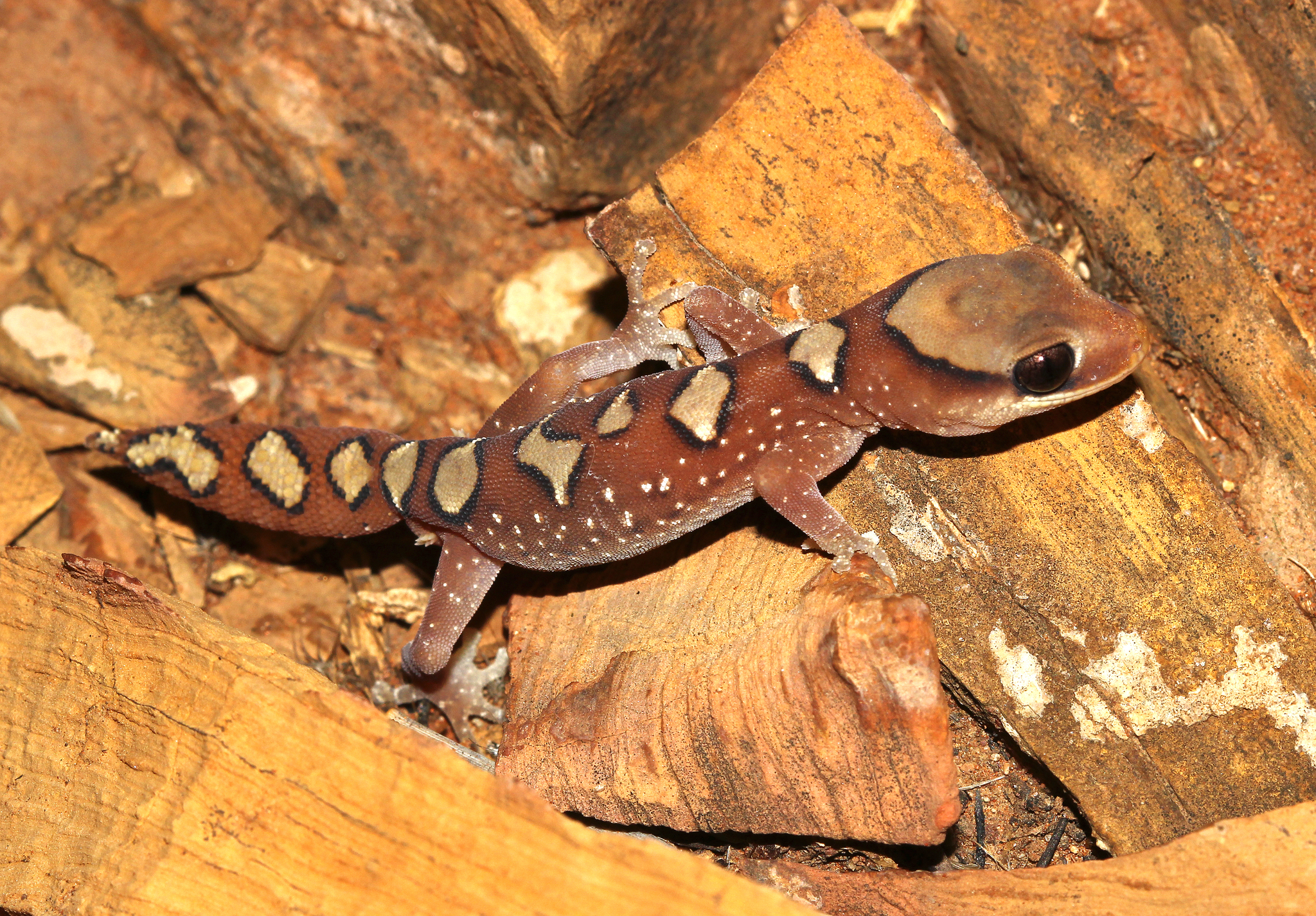

Conservation status
- Least Concern (IUCN 3.1)

Scientific classification
- Kingdom: Animalia
- Phylum: Chordata
- Class: Reptilia
- Order: Squamata
- Suborder: Gekkota
- Family: Diplodactylidae
- Genus: Diplodactylus
- Species: D. galeatus

Binomial name
- Diplodactylus galeatus Kluge, 1963

= Diplodactylus galeatus =

Species of lizard

Diplodactylus galeatus, sometimes called the helmeted gecko, is a gecko endemic to Australia.
