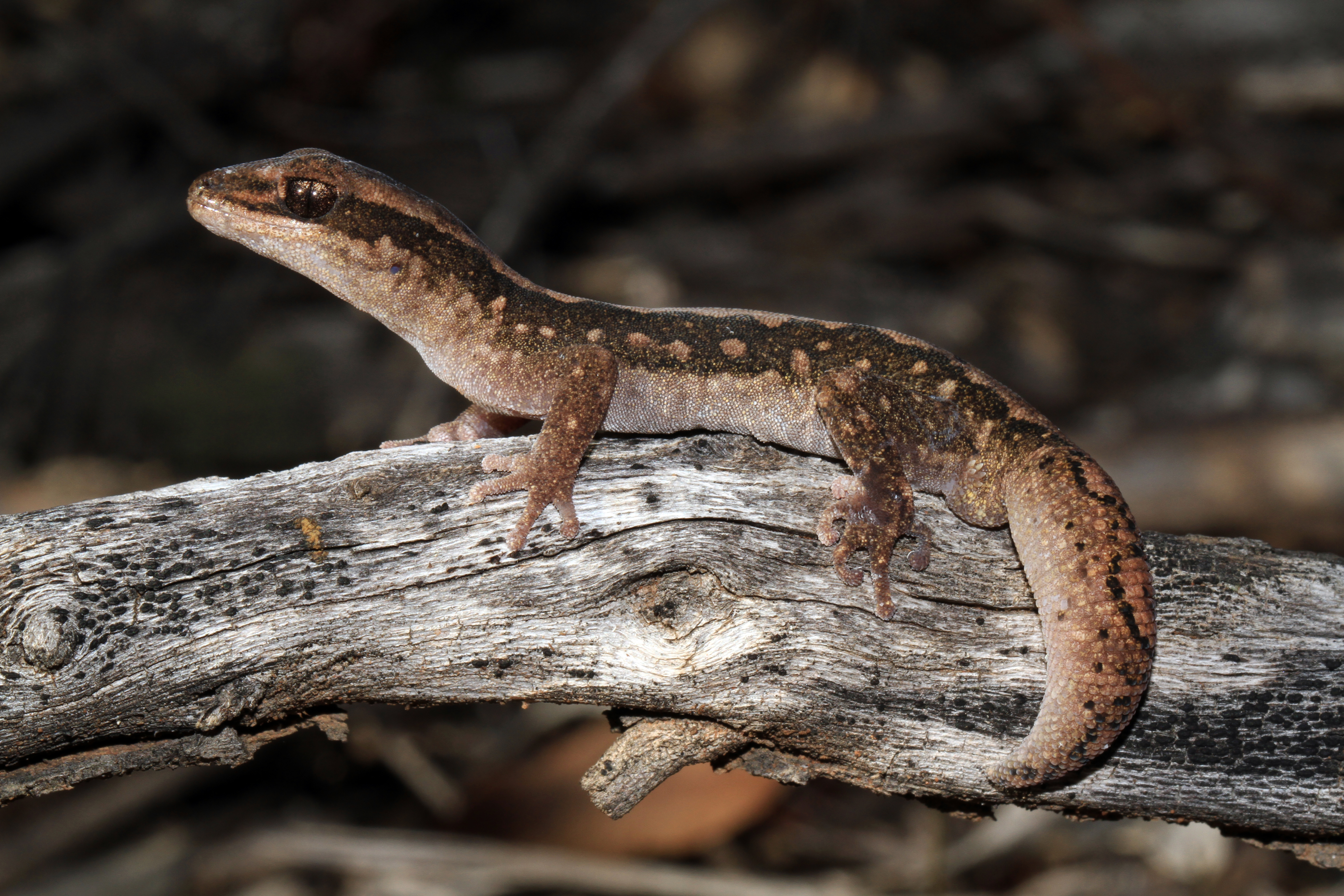
- Eastern stone gecko (Diplodactylus vittatus)

Scientific classification
- Kingdom: Animalia
- Phylum: Chordata
- Class: Reptilia
- Order: Squamata
- Suborder: Gekkota
- Family: Diplodactylidae
- Genus: Diplodactylus; Gray, 1832

= Diplodactylus =

Genus of lizards

Diplodactylus is a genus of geckos of the family Diplodactylidae from Australia. They are sometimes called stone geckos or fat-tailed geckos. Member species are morphologically similar but genetically distinct.

== Species ==
The following 27 species are included in Diplodactylus:

- Diplodactylus ameyi Couper & P. Oliver, 2016 – eastern deserts fat-tailed gecko
- Diplodactylus barraganae Couper, P. Oliver & Pepper, 2014 – gulf fat-tailed gecko
- Diplodactylus bilybara Couper, Pepper & P. Oliver, 2014 – western fat-tailed gecko
- Diplodactylus calcicolus Hutchinson, Doughty & P. Oliver, 2009 – south coast gecko
- Diplodactylus capensis Doughty, P. Oliver & Adams, 2008 – Cape Range stone gecko
- Diplodactylus conspicillatus Lucas & C. Frost, 1897 – burrow-plug gecko, variable fat-tailed gecko
- Diplodactylus custos Couper, P. Oliver & Pepper, 2014 – Kimberley fat-tailed gecko
- Diplodactylus fulleri Storr, 1978 – Lake Disappointment ground gecko
- Diplodactylus furcosus W. Peters, 1863 – forked gecko, Ranges stone gecko
- Diplodactylus galaxias Doughty, Pepper & Keogh, 2010 – Northern Pilbara beak-faced gecko
- Diplodactylus galeatus Kluge, 1963 – helmeted gecko
- Diplodactylus granariensis Storr, 1979 – western stone gecko
- Diplodactylus hillii Longman, 1915 – northern fat-tailed gecko
- Diplodactylus kenneallyi Storr, 1988 – Kenneally's gecko
- Diplodactylus klugei Aplin & Adams, 1998 – Kluge's gecko
- Diplodactylus laevis Sternfeld, 1925 – desert fat-tailed gecko
- Diplodactylus lateroides Doughty & P. Oliver, 2013 – speckled stone gecko
- Diplodactylus mitchelli Kluge, 1963 – Pilbara stone gecko
- Diplodactylus nebulosus Doughty & P. Oliver, 2013
- Diplodactylus ornatus Gray, 1845 – ornate stone gecko
- Diplodactylus platyurus Parker, 1926 – eastern fat-tailed gecko
- Diplodactylus polyophthalmus Günther, 1867 – spotted sandplain gecko
- Diplodactylus pulcher (Steindachner, 1870) – fine-faced gecko
- Diplodactylus savagei Kluge, 1963 – yellow-spotted Pilbara gecko
- Diplodactylus tessellatus (Günther, 1875) – tessellated gecko
- Diplodactylus vittatus Gray, 1832 – eastern stone gecko, stone gecko, wood gecko
- Diplodactylus wiru Hutchinson, Doughty & P. Oliver, 2009 – desert wood gecko

Nota bene: A binomial authority in parentheses indicates that the species was originally described in a genus other than Diplodactylus.
