= Mitchell's worm lizard =

Scientific classification
- Kingdom: Animalia
- Phylum: Chordata
- Class: Reptilia
- Order: Squamata
- Clade: Amphisbaenia
- Family: Amphisbaenidae
- Genus: Amphisbaena
- Species: A. mitchelli

Binomial name
- Amphisbaena mitchelli Procter, 1923

Species of lizard

Mitchell's worm lizard (Amphisbaena mitchelli) is a species of amphisbaenian in the family Amphisbaenidae. The species is endemic to Brazil.

== Common names ==
Common names for Amphisbaena mitchelli in Brazilian Portuguese include cobra-de-duas-cabeças (two-headed snake) and cobra-cega (blind snake).

== Etymology ==
The specific name, mitchelli, is in honor of British zoologist Peter Chalmers Mitchell.

== Description ==
Amphisbaena mitchelli is medium-sized for its genus. It is darker dorsally than it is ventrally. It has 211–220 body annuli, and two oval precoacal pores.

== Geographic range ==
Amphisbaena mitchelli is found in Brazil, in the states of Maranhão and Pará.

== Reproduction ==
Amphisbaena mitchelli is oviparous.
