= Diplodactylus savagei =

Conservation status
- Least Concern (IUCN 3.1)

Scientific classification
- Kingdom: Animalia
- Phylum: Chordata
- Class: Reptilia
- Order: Squamata
- Suborder: Gekkota
- Family: Diplodactylidae
- Genus: Diplodactylus
- Species: D. savagei

Binomial name
- Diplodactylus savagei Kluge, 1963

Synonyms
- Diplodactylus savagei Kluge, 1963; Manwellisaurus savagei — Wells & Wellington, 1989; Diplodactylus savagei — Kluge, 1993

Species of lizard

Diplodactylus savagei, known commonly as the yellow-spotted Pilbara gecko, is a species of lizard in the family Diplodactylidae. The species is endemic to Australia.

== Etymology ==
The specific name, savagei, is in honor of American herpetologist Jay M. Savage.

== Geographic range ==
D. savagei is found in the Pilbara region of Western Australia.

== Habitat ==
The preferred natural habitats of D. savagei are shrubland, grassland, and rocky areas.

== Description ==
Dorsally, D. savagei is dark reddish brown, with yellowish spots which tend to form transverse dashes. The ventral surfaces are white.

== Reproduction ==
D. savagei is oviparous.
