= Diplodactylus klugei =

Conservation status
- Least Concern (IUCN 3.1)

Scientific classification
- Kingdom: Animalia
- Phylum: Chordata
- Class: Reptilia
- Order: Squamata
- Suborder: Gekkota
- Family: Diplodactylidae
- Genus: Diplodactylus
- Species: D. klugei

Binomial name
- Diplodactylus klugei Aplin & Adams, 1998

Species of lizard

Diplodactylus klugei is a species of gecko, a lizard in the family Diplodactylidae. The species is endemic to Australia.

== Etymology ==
The specific name, klugei, is in honor of American herpetologist Arnold G. Kluge.

== Description ==
D. klugei is slender-bodied. The rostral is in contact with the nostril. The subdigital lamellae are granular, with the terminal plates enlarged.

== Geographic range ==
D. klugei is found in the Australian state of Western Australia.

== Habitat ==
The preferred natural habitats of D. klugei are desert, grassland, and savanna.

== Behavior ==
D. klugei is terrestrial.

== Reproduction ==
D. klugei is oviparous.
