= Spanish Testament =

First edition (publ. Gollancz)

Spanish Testament is a 1937 book by Arthur Koestler, describing his experiences during the Spanish Civil War. Part II of the book was subsequently published on its own, with minor modifications, under the title Dialogue with Death (see below). Koestler made three trips to Spain during the civil war; the third time he was captured, sentenced to death and imprisoned by the Nationalist forces of General Franco. Koestler was working as an espionage agent on behalf of the Comintern and as an agent of the Second Spanish Republic's official news agency, using for cover accreditation to the British daily News Chronicle.

The book was published in London by Victor Gollancz Ltd. The 'Contents' of the book is in two parts: Part I describes the context in which he was captured, divided into IX chapters, each with its own title. Part II, titled Dialogue with Death, describes Koestler's prison experiences under sentence of death. This part was written in the late autumn of 1937 immediately after his release from prison, when the events were still vivid.

In the second volume of his autobiography The Invisible Writing, written by Koestler fifteen years later, the following footnote appears:

In all foreign editions, including the American, Dialogue with Death appeared as a self-contained book. In the original English edition, however (Gollancz and Left Book Club, 1937), it formed the second part of Spanish Testament the first part of which consisted of the earlier propaganda book on Spain that I had written for Muenzenberg. Spanish Testament is (and shall remain) out of print; Dialogue with Death has been reissued in England under that title, in the form in which it was originally written.

== Contents ==
INTRODUCTION (by Katharine Atholl)

AUTHOR'S FOREWORD

PART I

I. Journey to Rebel Headquarters

II. Historic Retrospect

III. The Outbreak

IV. The Background

V. The Church Militant

VI. Propaganda

VII. The Heroes of the Alcázar

VIII. Madrid

IX. The Last Days of Malaga

PART II

Dialogue with Death

EPILOGUE

== Background ==
Koestler had taken an ill-considered decision to stay at Málaga in southern Spain when the Republican forces withdrew from it. He had only narrowly escaped arrest by Franco's army on his previous sojourn into Nationalist territory, when on his second day in Nationalist-held Seville he was recognised by a former colleague of his from Ullstein's in Berlin, who knew that Koestler was a Communist. This time he was less fortunate and was arrested, summarily sentenced to death and sent off to imprisonment in Seville. The episode is recorded in detail in the memoirs of Sir Peter Chalmers Mitchell, a 72 year old retired zoologist (and the driving force behind the creation of Whipsnade Zoo) who was providing Koestler with safe haven at the time and who was also arrested.

The second half of the book is devoted to Koestler's time in the prison, in the company of numerous political prisoners – most of them Spanish Republicans. Prisoners lived under the constant threat of summary execution without trial, without warning and without any evident logic in the choice of victims. Every morning, prisoners would wake to find that some of their number had been executed during the night.

The daily routine in the prison until the moment of execution was quite comfortable, and conditions were better than in many British jails at the time. As Koestler notes, the Seville Prison was established just a few years before, during the brief period of the Second Spanish Republic, when liberal reformers wanted to make of it a model for the humane treatment of prisoners. After taking over the city, the Nationalist forces made little change to the prison regulations and routine, and kept on much of the original staff – except for adding their execution squads in the prison courtyard.

The contradiction between relatively humane daily treatment and the constant threat of summary execution forms a central theme of the book. It seems to have created a feeling of dislocation and disorientation, and Koestler spent much of his time in some kind of mystical passivity. He alternated between using the well-stocked prison library, to whose books he was given access, and going on hunger strikes. After some time, it became evident to Koestler and his fellow-prisoners that he was in an exceptional situation and that his captors were reluctant to carry out the execution order against him. Although he did not know it at the time, the British Foreign Office was taking an interest in his case, and their inquiries made the Spanish reluctant to execute him.

Koestler quotes a message he got from three other prisoners, Republican militiamen: "Dear comrade foreigner, we three are also condemned to death, and they will shoot us tonight or tomorrow. But you may survive; and if you ever come out you must tell the world about all those who kill us, because we want liberty and no Hitler."

The three were executed shortly afterwards. Koestler considered his book, written after he was released and returned to Britain, to be the testament of the three men and his other fellow prisoners who did not survive.

== Influence on later work ==
Koestler's prison experience contributed to his acute psychological insight in his portrayal of events in Darkness at Noon (1941), an anti-Communist novel which became a best-seller and gained him international attention.
