= Diplodactylus pulcher =

Conservation status
- Least Concern (IUCN 3.1)

Scientific classification
- Kingdom: Animalia
- Phylum: Chordata
- Class: Reptilia
- Order: Squamata
- Suborder: Gekkota
- Family: Diplodactylidae
- Genus: Diplodactylus
- Species: D. pulcher

Binomial name
- Diplodactylus pulcher Steindachner, 1870

Species of lizard

Diplodactylus pulcher, sometimes called the fine-faced gecko, is a gecko endemic to Australia.
