= Peter Chalmers Mitchell =

Scottish zoologist

Sir Peter Chalmers Mitchell
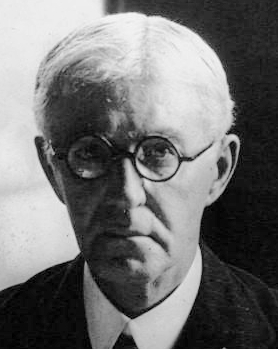
- Born: 23 November 1864; Dunfermline, Scotland
- Died: 2 July 1945 (aged 80); London, England
- Known for: Founding Whipsnade Zoo
- Scientific career
- Fields: Zoology

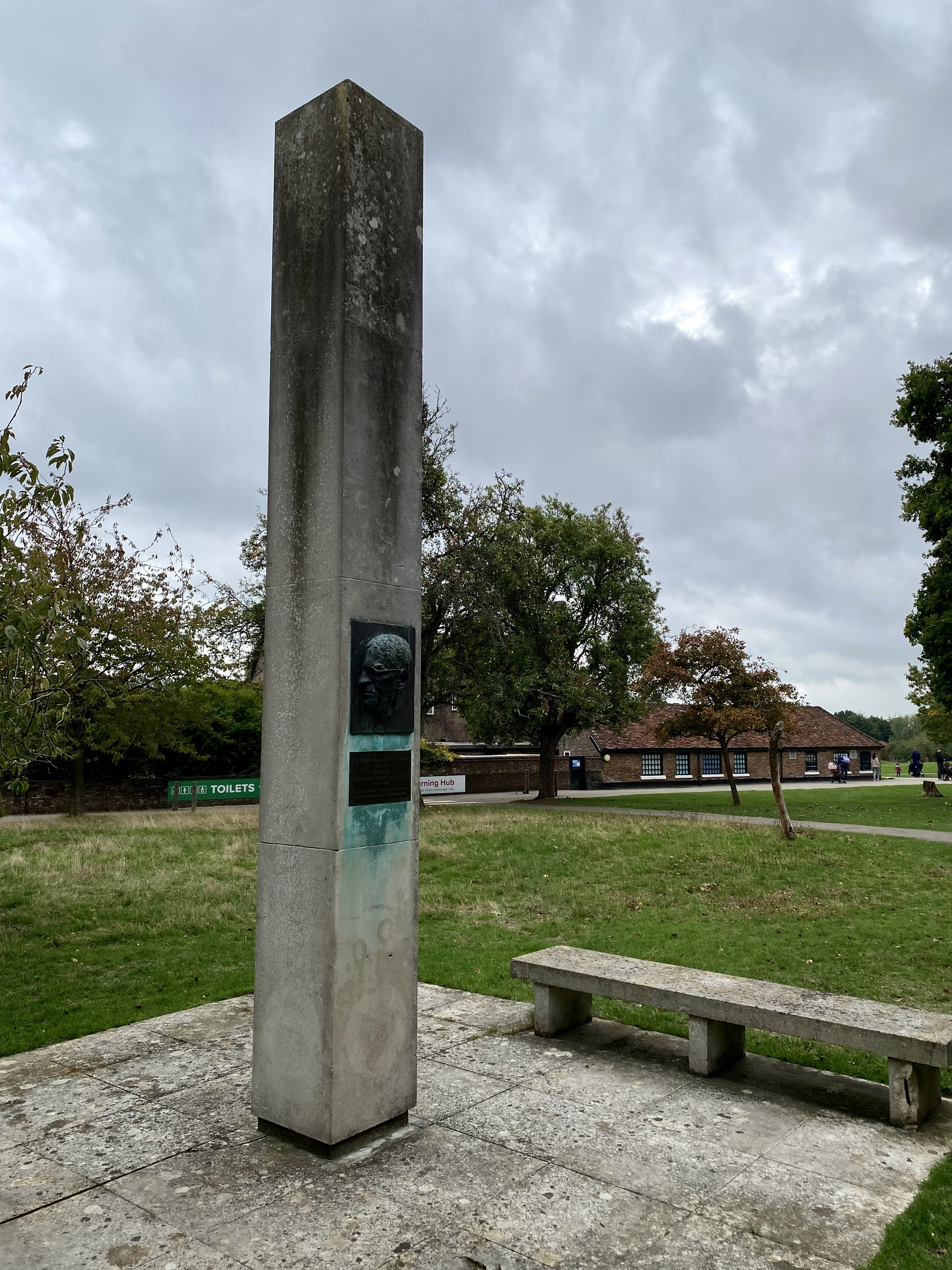
The memorial obelisk to Mitchell at Whipsnade Zoo

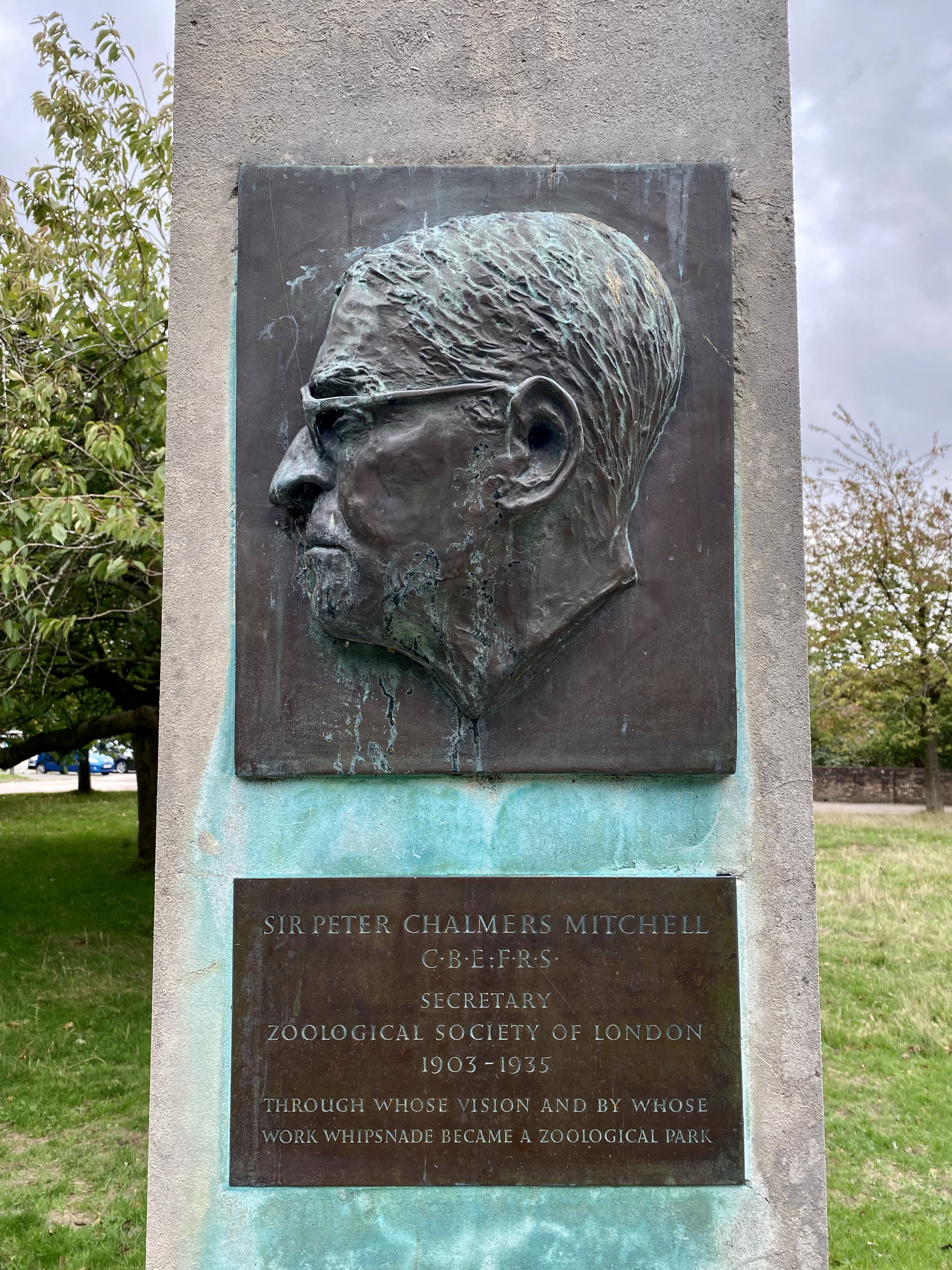
The plaque at the Whipsnade Zoo memorial

Sir Peter Chalmers Mitchell CBE FRS FZS (23 November 1864 – 2 July 1945) was a Scottish zoologist who was Secretary of the Zoological Society of London from 1903 to 1935. During this time, he directed the policy of the Zoological Gardens of London and created the world's first open zoological park, Whipsnade Zoo.

== Early life ==
Peter Chalmers Mitchell was the son of the Rev. Alexander Mitchell, a Presbyterian minister in Dunfermline, Scotland, and Marion Chalmers. Mitchell gained an MA at the University of Aberdeen, and moved to Christ Church, Oxford, where he read for natural science, specialising in zoology. After success in the honours examination of 1888, he was appointed University Demonstrator in Zoology.

In 1896, he was the anonymous author of an article in the Saturday Review entitled "A Biological View of English Foreign Policy" which proposed the inevitability of a final battle between Britain and Germany, in which one would have to be destroyed. (Having acknowledged his authorship during World War I, he still declared himself "unrepentant" about it in a letter to The Times in May 1939, describing the article as "prophetic").

In April 1916, now an army Captain, he was responsible for setting up a specialist department MI7(B)4 to oversee the production of military propaganda to be dropped from the air over enemy lines.

== Zoo ==
Despite a tenure of 32 years, Mitchell was not the longest-serving Secretary of the Zoological Society. His predecessor, Philip Lutley Sclater, had been in office over forty years, from 1860 to 1902. Mitchell was succeeded by Julian Huxley.

Mitchell's brainchild, Whipsnade Park, was opened in 1931 on the Dunstable Downs, in the heart of Bedfordshire. Whipsnade is an open air zoo in the countryside, where animals occupy large enclosures rather than cages. The park is involved in a variety of conservation activities.

In 1933 he was one of eleven people (Note: The letter was signed: Desborough; Hugh S. Gladstone; Grey of Fallodon; Julian S. Huxley (Chancellor of Oxford University); T. G Longstaff; Percy R. Lowe; P. Chalmers Mitchell; Rothschild; Scone M.P. (Chairman, British Trust for Ornithology); E. L. Turner; H. F. Witherby (President, British Ornithologists' Union)) involved in the appeal that led to the foundation of the British Trust for Ornithology (BTO), an organisation for the study of birds in the British Isles.

== Lectures ==
In 1911, Mitchell delivered the Royal Institution Christmas Lecture on The Childhood of Animals.

In February 1915, Mitchell gave three lectures on the subject of evolution and foreign policy at the Royal Institution that expanded upon his 1896 article. These were combined and published in the form of a book entitled Evolution and the War in May 1915.

== Málaga ==
On retiring from the zoo, Mitchell moved to Málaga, staying there during the first six months or so of the Spanish Civil War, until the city was taken on behalf of the rebels by Italian troops. An account of his last days in Málaga, including his arrest along with Arthur Koestler, is included in Koestler's book Spanish Testament and in Mitchell's own memoir, My House in Málaga, published in 1938.

== Politics ==
Mitchell stood as an independent candidate at the 1938 Combined Scottish Universities by-election, but took last position, with 13.5% of the votes cast.

== Death ==
Mitchell died on 2 July 1945, aged 80, after being injured in an accident on 29 June outside the London Zoo. After stepping off a bus, he was struck by a taxicab. A jury ruled the death accidental.

== Legacy ==
A species of South American worm lizard, Amphisbaena mitchelli, is named in his honour. He also proved, in a now classic treatise, namely, “On the Intestinal Tract of Mammals,” that the caecum of Mammals is directly homologous with the paired caeca of Birds; that is to say, a pair being the original state.

== Publications ==
=== As author ===
- 1900. Thomas Henry Huxley: a Sketch of his Life and Work. Putnam's, London & N.Y; 2nd ed. Methuen, London 1913.
- 1911. Official Guide to the Gardens of the Zoological Society of London, Zoological Society of London, London.
- 1912. The Childhood of Animals. Heinemann; Penguin.
- 1915. Evolution and the War. J. Murray, London.
- 1930. Materialism and Vitalism in Biology. Oxford.
- 1931. A Centenary History of the London Zoo.
- 1937. My Fill of Days. Faber & Faber, London.
- 1938. My House in Málaga. Faber & Faber, London. (Republished 2019, The Clapton Press, London).

=== As Translator ===
- 1903. The Nature of Man: Studies in Optimistic Philosophy, by Élie Metchnikoff, G.P. Putnam's Sons, London. The original title in French was Études sur la nature humaine, (1903).
- 1934. The Seven Pillars, by Wenceslao Fernández Flórez.
- 1935. Mr Witt Among the Rebels: The Story of a Reluctant Revolutionist in the Days of Victoria, by Ramón J. Sender, Faber and Faber, London. The original title in Spanish was Mr. Witt en el cantón, (1935).
- 1936. Seven Red Sundays, by Ramón J. Sender, Faber & Faber, London. The original title in Spanish was Siete domingos rojos, (1932).
- 1937. The War in Spain: a personal narrative, by Ramón J. Sender, Faber & Faber, London. The original title in Spanish was Contraataque (1937).
- 1944. The Forge, by Arturo Barea, Faber and Faber, London. The original title in Spanish was La Forja (1941).

In addition, like Henry Scherren FZS, Chalmers Mitchell made a number of contributions to the 1911 Encyclopædia Britannica under the initials "P.C.M.". Chalmers Mitchell was critical of Scherren's history of the ZSL, but was in turn criticised by John Bastin for his work on the same subject.

== Bibliography ==
- Crook, D.P. (1989). "Peter Chalmers Mitchell and antiwar evolutionism in Britain during the Great War". Journal of the History of Biology. 22 (2): 325–356. doi:10.1007/bf00139517. S2CID 85087144.

== Notes ==
Professional and academic associations
Preceded by Philip Lutley Sclater	Secretary of the Zoological Society of London; 1903–1935	Succeeded by Julian Huxley
