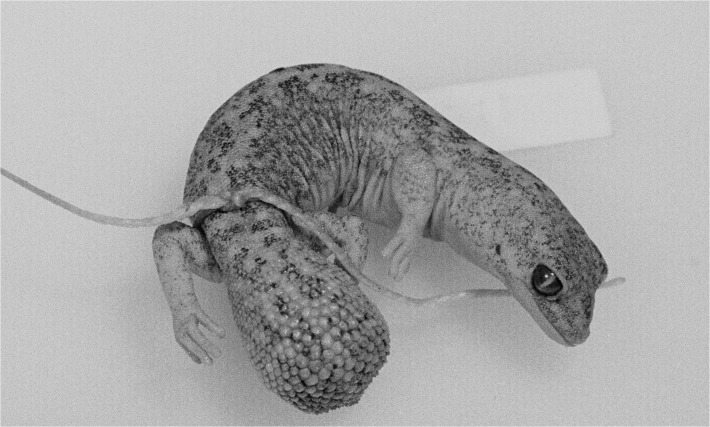

Conservation status
- Least Concern (IUCN 3.1)

Scientific classification
- Kingdom: Animalia
- Phylum: Chordata
- Class: Reptilia
- Order: Squamata
- Suborder: Gekkota
- Family: Diplodactylidae
- Genus: Diplodactylus
- Species: D. platyurus

Binomial name
- Diplodactylus platyurus Parker, 1926

= Diplodactylus platyurus =

Species of lizard

Diplodactylus platyurus, sometimes called the eastern fat-tailed gecko, is a gecko endemic to Australia.

It is found in Queensland and South Australia.
