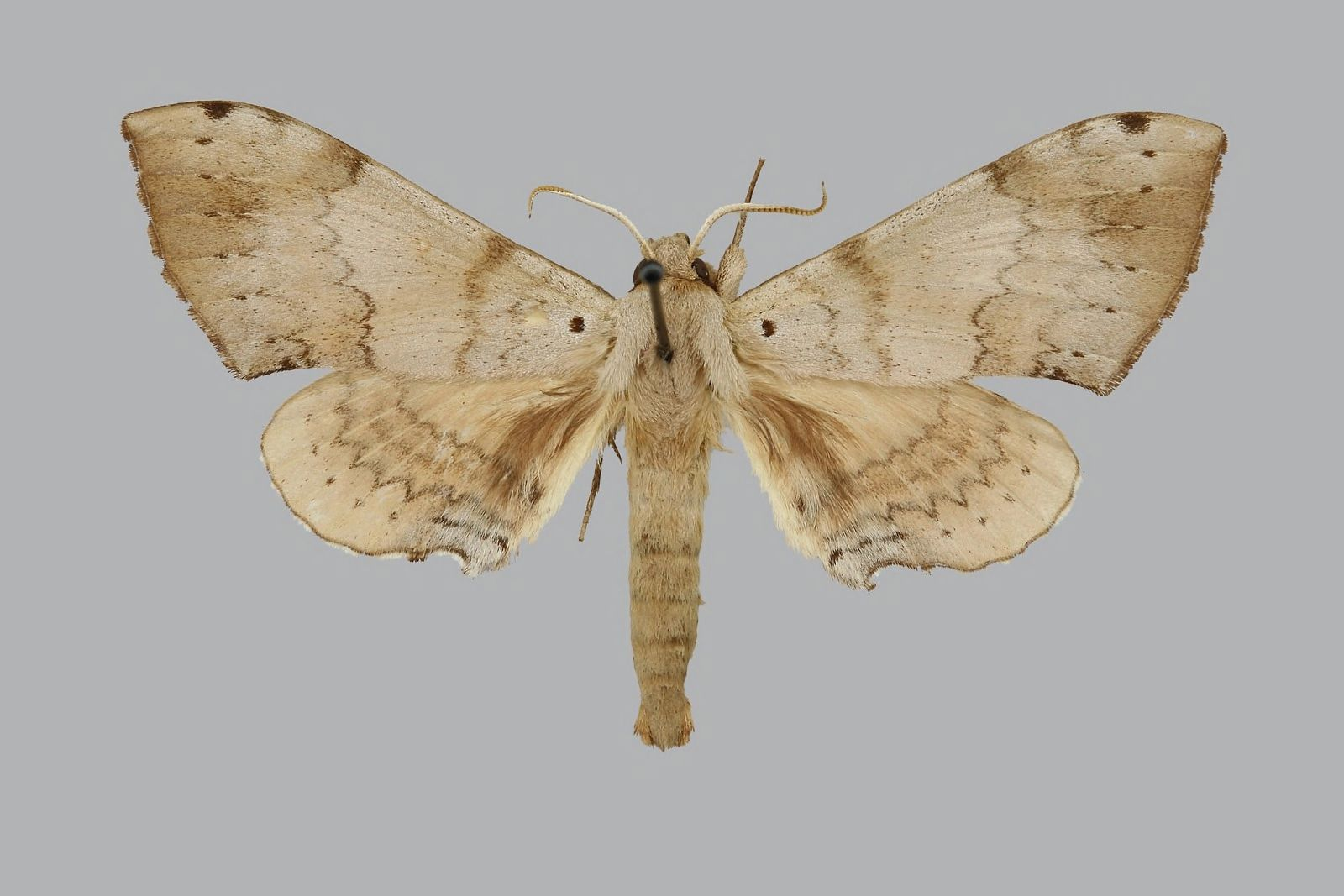

Scientific classification
- Kingdom: Animalia
- Phylum: Arthropoda
- Class: Insecta
- Order: Lepidoptera
- Family: Sphingidae
- Genus: Andriasa
- Species: A. mitchelli

Binomial name
- Andriasa mitchelli Hayes, 1973

= Andriasa mitchelli =

Species of moth

Andriasa mitchelli is a moth of the family Sphingidae. It is known from Malawi.
