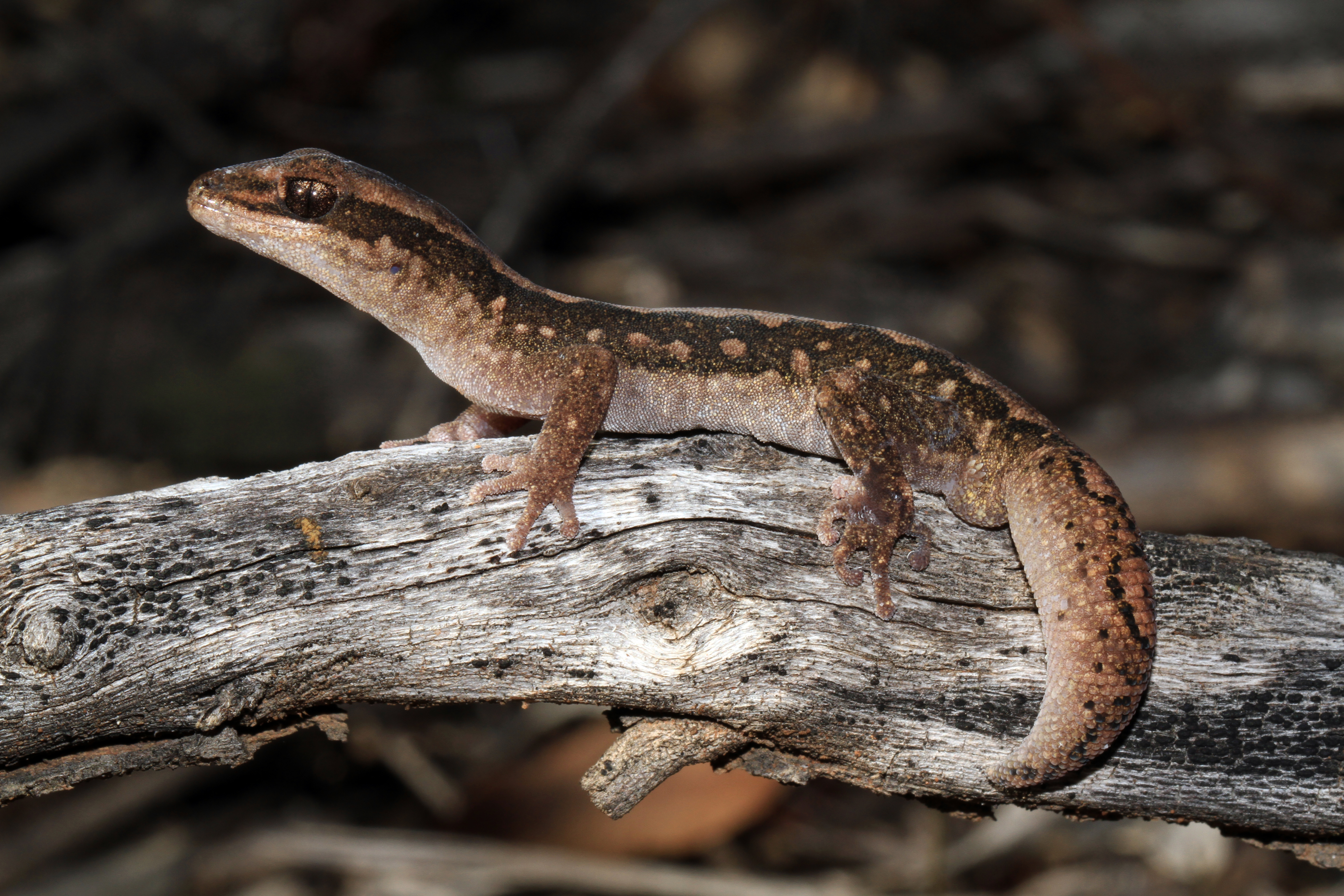

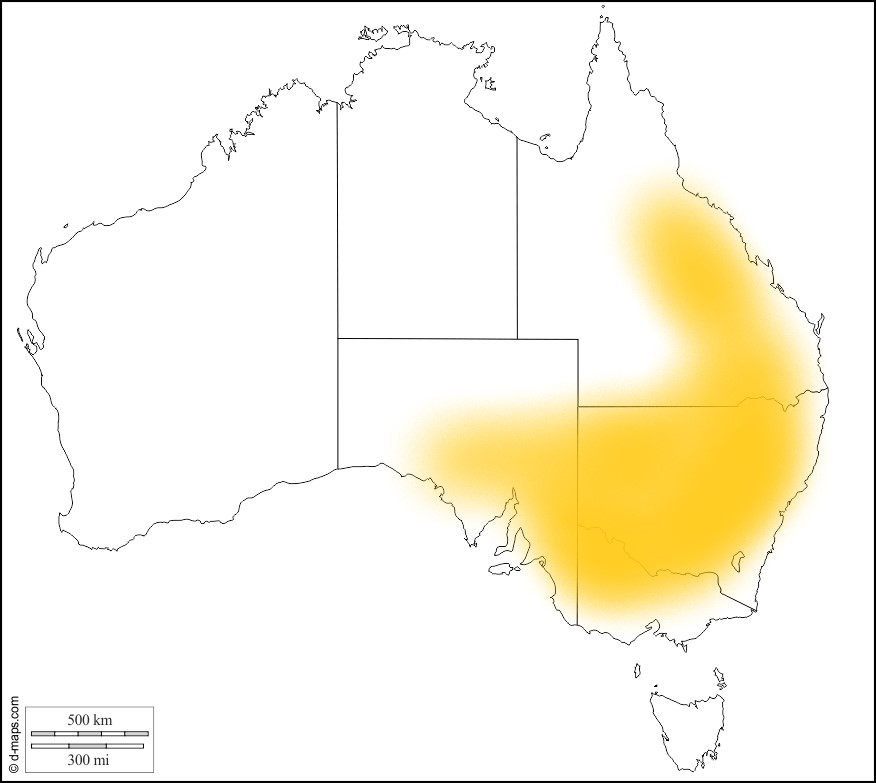

Conservation status
- Least Concern (IUCN 3.1)

Scientific classification
- Kingdom: Animalia
- Phylum: Chordata
- Class: Reptilia
- Order: Squamata
- Suborder: Gekkota
- Family: Diplodactylidae
- Genus: Diplodactylus
- Species: D. vittatus

Binomial name
- Diplodactylus vittatus Gray, 1832

= Diplodactylus vittatus =

Species of lizard

Diplodactylus vittatus, commonly known as the eastern stone gecko, stone gecko, and wood gecko, is a species of diplodactylid lizards that occurs in forest, shrubland and arid regions across Australia. It is widespread across the states of Queensland, Victoria and New South Wales, commonly found in dry peripheral bushlands. This gecko can be kept as a pet or seen within zoo enclosures.

== Description ==
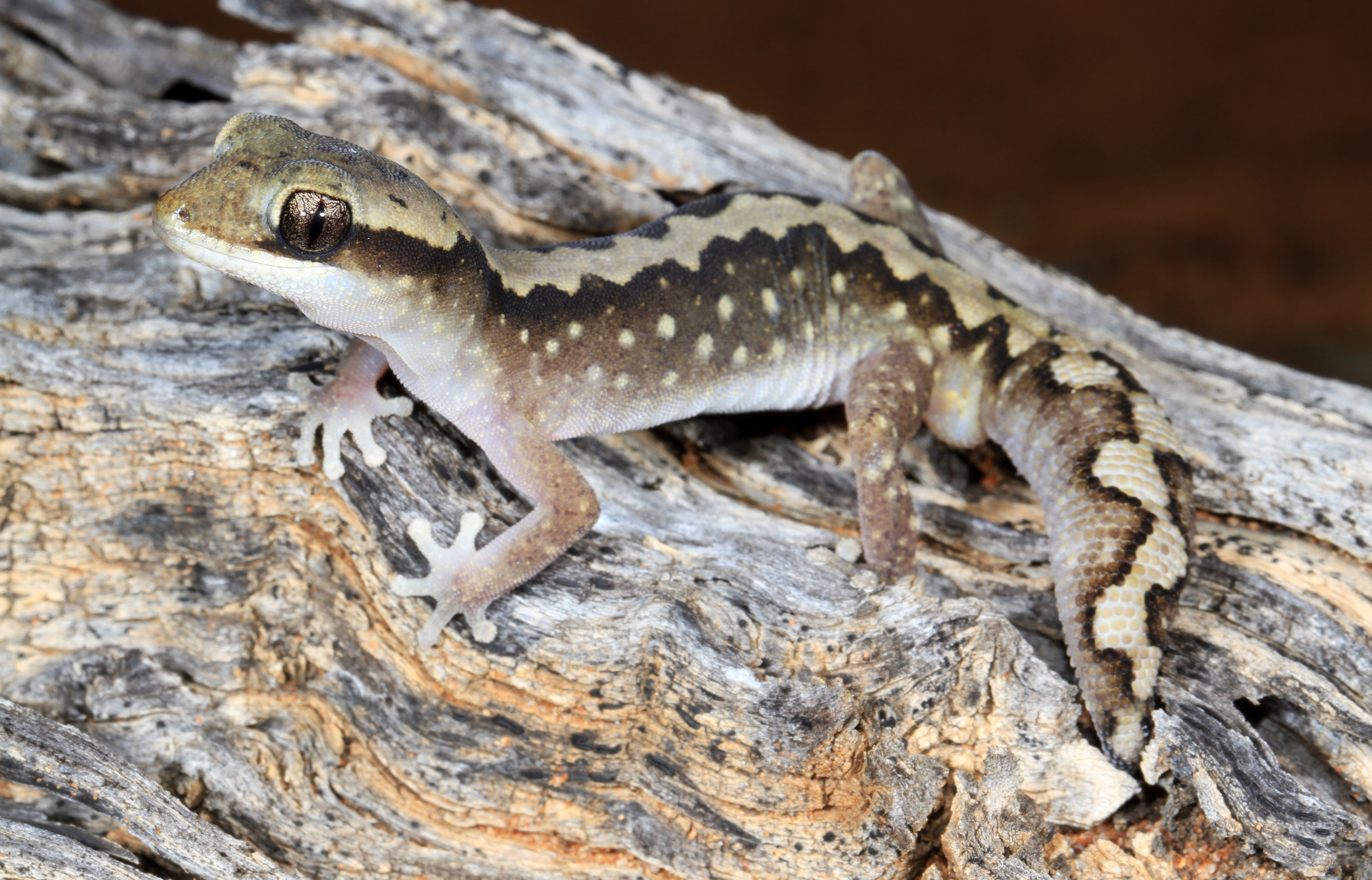
D. vittatus

Diplodactylus vittatus is a small nocturnal terrestrial lizard which is native to Australia. The eastern stone gecko has a dark brown body with pale notched zigzag strips from the back to the tip of its short plump tail. The gecko has physical attributes of four limbs with four setae covered digits, large eyes with vertical pupils, fleshy tongue (which the species uses to clean their eyes), tiny granular scales, soft bodies and no eye lids. The tail is used for many purposes including balancing when climbing, fat storage, and camouflage.

Diplodactylus vittatus can grow up to 6 cm long from snout to vent and 9 cm from snout to tail end. The gecko has a relatively short live span of around 5 years.

== Taxonomy ==
John Edward Gray was the scientific author who described the Diplodactylus vittatus in 1832. The family Diplodactylidae contains a diverse group of geckos that are from the suborder Gekkota. The genus was characterised by similar morphologies but genetically divergent lineages and taxa.

== Distribution ==
Diplodactylus vittatus are found throughout forest, shrublands and semi-arid environments of Queensland, Victoria, New South Wales and South Australia. The species is commonly found in dry bushlands particularly lightly timbered but mostly absent from suburbs.

== Ecology and habitat ==
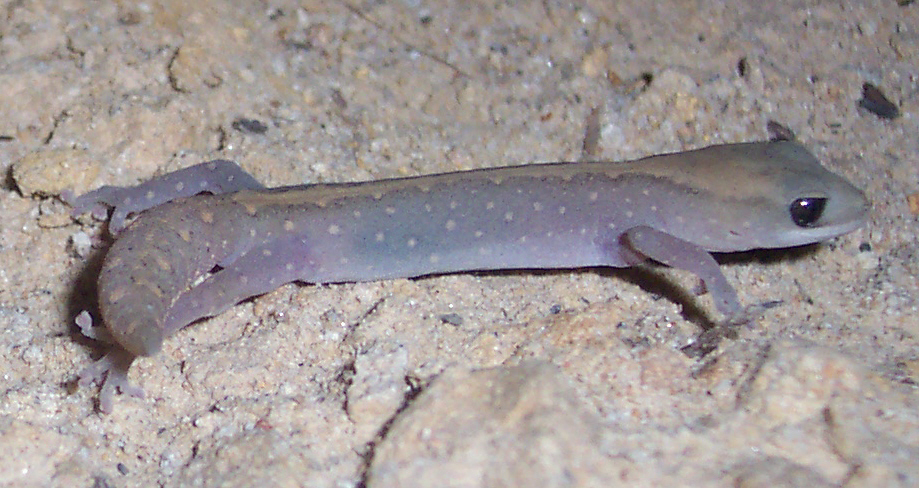
D. vittatus

Diplodactylus vittatus is a nocturnal (night-active) and terrestrial (ground-dwelling) native Australian reptile. This species within diurnal hours will shelter in burrows and depressions under rocks or fallen timbers (reason for the common name of stone or wood gecko).

Diplodactylus vittatus, like majority of reptiles, are ectothermic, meaning the species requires their external environment to maintain and regulate their body temperature via physiological and behavioural means. Diplodactylus vittatus would choose microhabitats to forage within which were between their preferred temperature range (17°C–26°C) and choose to shelter in warmer locations which would aid in their thermoregulation during the diurnal hours, which enhances physiological processes of digestion and egg development. The species would select their foraging microhabitats and burrowing location depending on temperature needs of the individual to either increase or decrease their body temperature. Failure of maintaining thermoregulation can lead to loss of energy, predation, increased competition especially for resources and decrease access to their prey.

Diplodactylus vittatus heavily relies on foliage, rocks and debris for surviving as the species have adapted to using camouflage, these environments providing their main food source, therefore the stone gecko can be commonly found in these locations.

This species will communicate to each other by noises of clicking, chirping and barking, and also through body language (standing on hind legs). This communication can be used to attract a mate or when males are defending territories.

== Reproduction ==
Diplodactylus vittatus is an oviparous (egg-laying) with breeding seasons being between September through to February depending on their environment and location. The female will have clutch sizes of two eggs, having multiple clutches in the breeding season with females laying their eggs in leaves, bark, burrows and debris. The males' actively defend their territories by chirping, clicking or barking but these noises can be used to attract a mate too.

== Diet ==
Diplodactylus vittatus are insectivores, meaning their primary diet consists of insects which the species actively hunt by either catching their prey with their tongue or closing their jaw. Diplodactylus vittatus foraging activity is temperature dependent having a narrow air and substrate temperature range of between 17°C and 26°C, therefore the species activity happens in falling temperatures, mainly at dusk.

== Predators ==
The predators of Diplodactylus vittatus include larger reptiles, birds, snakes, frogs and some mammals. When the animal feels threatened, it will intimidate its predator by opening its mouth and standing tall to appear larger in size. The species has adapted to camouflage and sheds the tails in order to avoid and escape their predators.

== Threats ==
Diplodactylus vittatus foraging activities commence during dusk causing the gecko to struggle to maintain its body temperature due to needing to thermoregulate, therefore climate change can pose a threat to the Eastern Stone Geckos thermoregulation and foraging activities. Habitat loss and degradation are other threats that could affect the species.
