= Arnold G. Kluge =

American herpetologist

- Education: University of Southern California
- Known for: Extensive studies in systematics, evolutionary biology, ecology of amphibians and reptiles
- Awards: Fulbright and Guggenheim Fellowships
- Scientific career
- Fields: Zoology
- Workplaces: University of Michigan, Museum of Zoology

Arnold G. Kluge is professor emeritus of zoology and curator emeritus of amphibians and reptiles at the University of Michigan, Museum of Zoology.

Kluge authored over 140 journal articles. He served as past president of the Willi Hennig Society and as editor-in-chief of its journal Cladistics. He served at the University of Michigan from 1965 until his retirement in 2003.

He is known for extensive studies in systematics, evolutionary biology, and ecology of amphibians and reptiles He also advanced the theory and philosophy of phylogenetic inference bringing Popperian falsification into the fold of cladistics.

Amongst the new taxa published by Kluge is Crenadactylus, tiny Australian clawless geckos reclassified as a separate genus with co-author James R. Dixon in 1964. He also described Aprasia pseudopulchella (Flinders Ranges worm-lizard), endemic to South Australia, in 1974.

== Eponyms ==
Kluge is honored in the specific names of three species of lizards.

- Cyrtodactylus klugei
- Diplodactylus klugei
- Lygodactylus klugei
