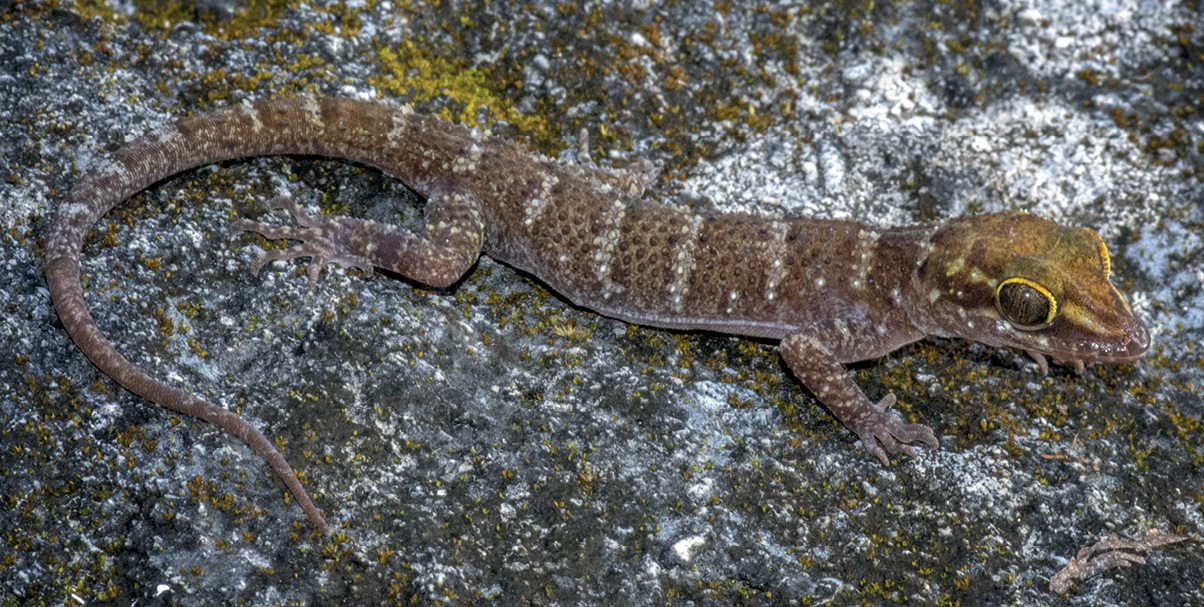

Scientific classification
- Kingdom: Animalia
- Phylum: Chordata
- Class: Reptilia
- Order: Squamata
- Suborder: Gekkota
- Family: Gekkonidae
- Genus: Cyrtodactylus
- Species: C. santana

Binomial name
- Cyrtodactylus santana Chan, Grismer, Santana, Pinto, Loke, and Conaboy, 2023

= Cyrtodactylus santana =

Species of gecko from East Timor

Cyrtodactylus santana is a species of gecko found in the Nino Konis Santana National Park, which is located at the eastern end of Timor-Leste. It is thought to be nocturnal, and to inhabit limestone caves. Described in January 2023, it is the first Cyrtodactylus species described from Timor-Leste, and remains understudied.

== Etymology and discovery ==
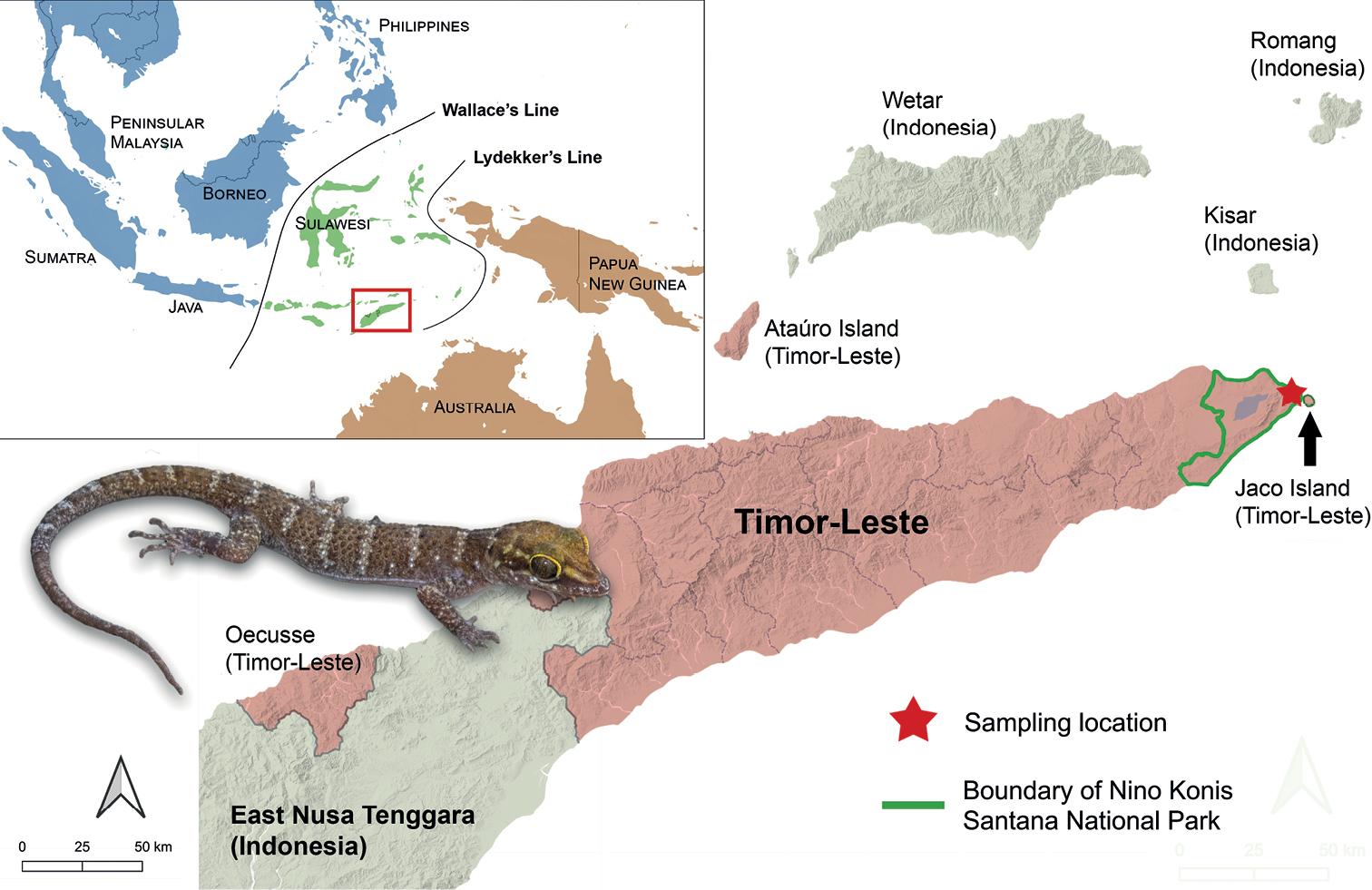
The species was discovered near the eastern end of the island of Timor.

Surveys of reptiles in East Timor took place following the publication of the first comprehensive assessment of reptile knowledge in the country in 2011. These surveys found Cyrtodactylus lizards that were thought to be undescribed species. A survey in August 2022 found morphologically distinct individuals, whose description was published in January 2023. While the first individual was seen during the day, the surveyors were only able to catch specimens at night.

The survey that discovered the species was a collaboration between the Lee Kong Chian Natural History Museum, Conservation International, and the Ministry of Agriculture and Fisheries. The holotype—an adult male—and nine other specimens are kept at the Lee Kong Chian Natural History Museum in Singapore. The species name refers to the Nino Konis Santana National Park, where the species was found. This park is named after Nino Konis Santana, a Falintil leader involved in resistance to the Indonesian occupation of East Timor, whose home village is in the park.

== Taxonomy ==
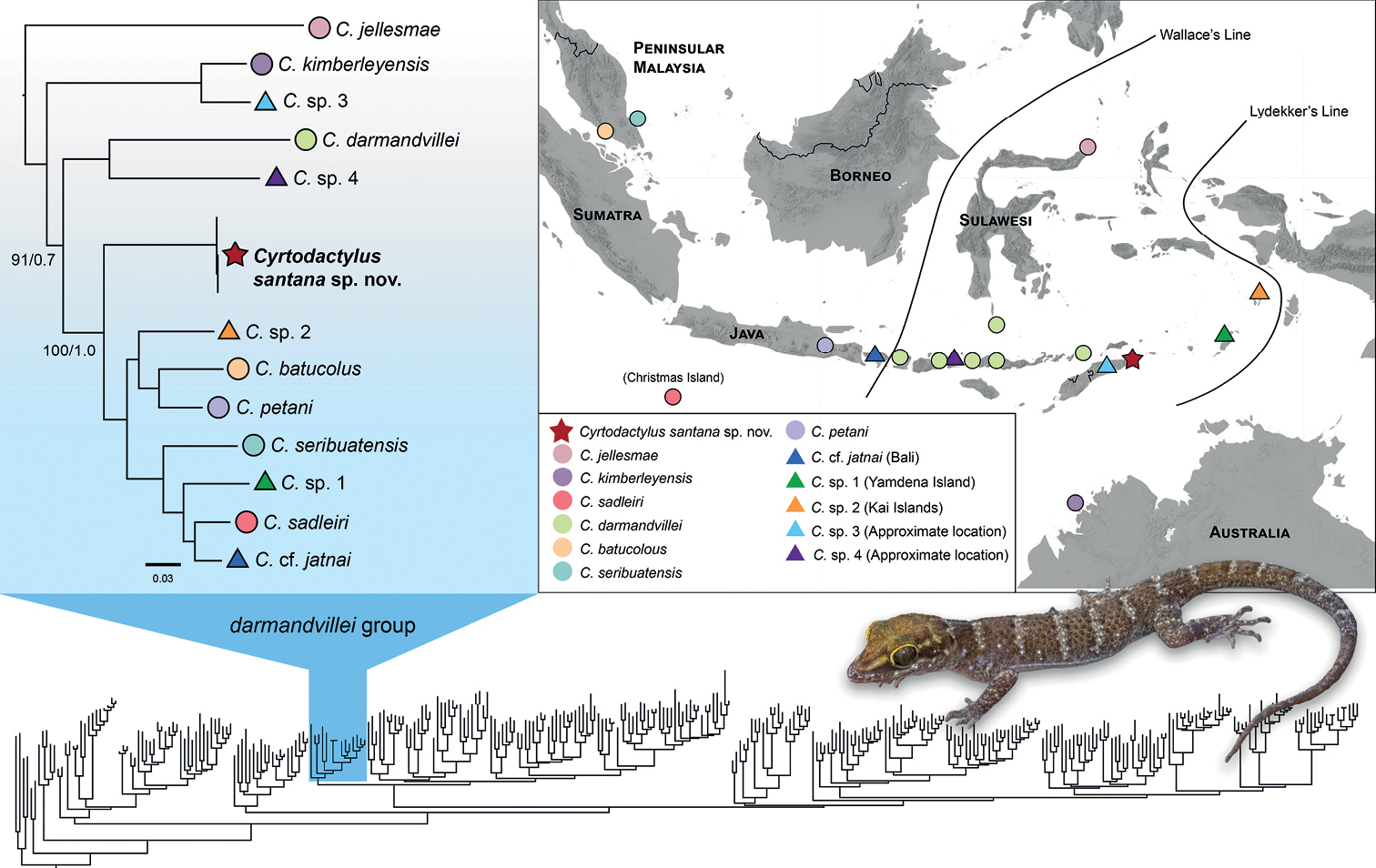
Species related to Cyrtodactylus santana are found both inside Wallacea and outside it.

C. santana lies within the clade of C. darmandvillei. Within this, it is a sister group to a clade containing C. batucolus, C. jatnai, C. petani, C. sadleiri, C. seribuatensis, and two undescribed lineages. The relationships and ecological history of this clade is uncertain. While some species within the darmandvillei group are found outside of Wallacea, it is thought the group originated within Wallacea and dispersed elsewhere. C. santana is the first described Cyrtodactylus species from East Timor. However, one undescribed lineage has been sampled, and it is expected that many more remain unidentified, meaning current taxonomic understanding may change significantly through new research.

== Description ==
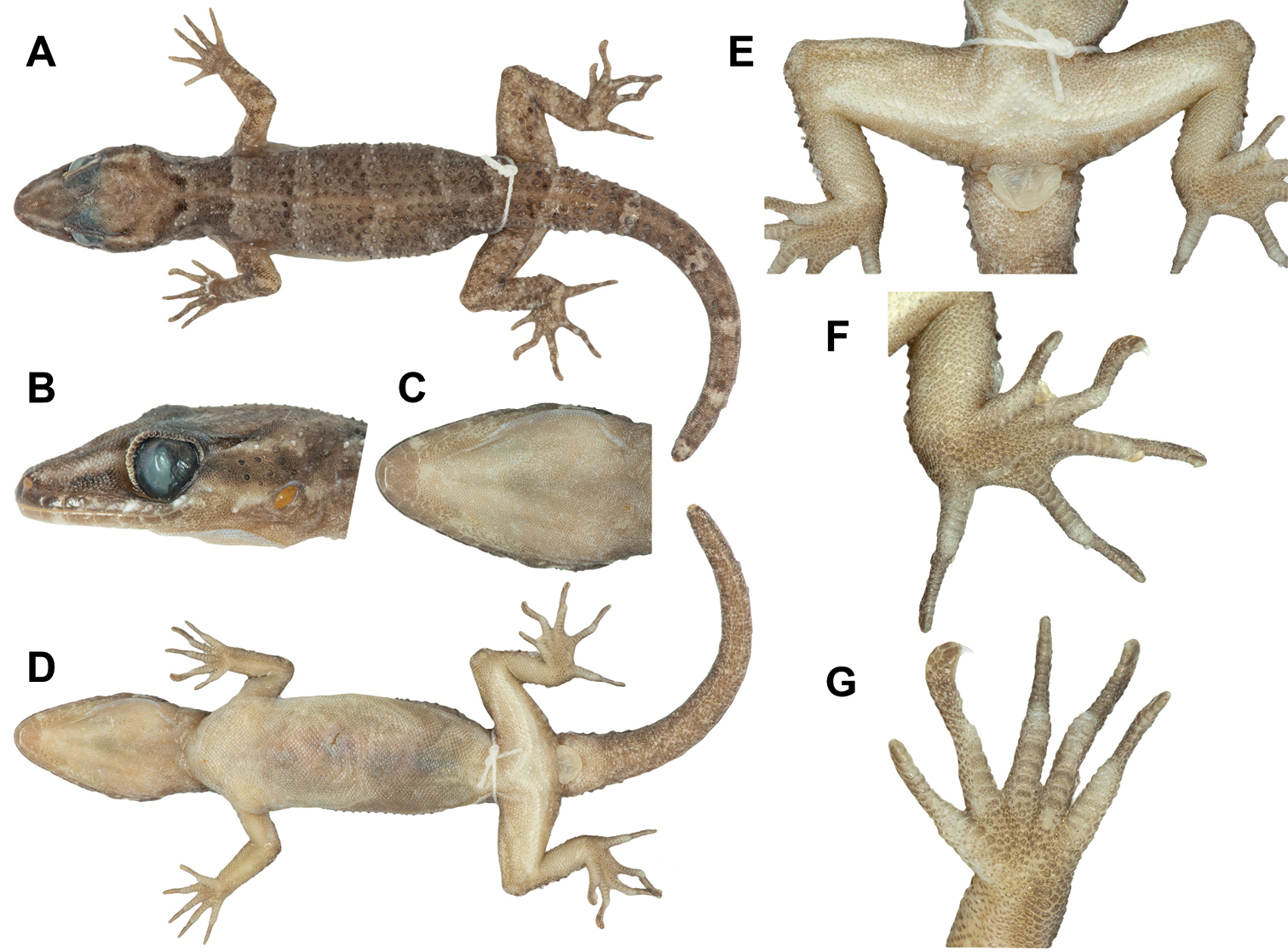
The holotype specimen, an adult male

This species is morphologically adapted for life on rocks, having similar traits to closely related species that share this lifestyle. Adults reach just over 7 centimetres (2.8 in) snout–vent length. While their top side is yellowish to dark brown, their bottoms are white, an example of countershading. The top colours form bands, with the specific pattern varying between individuals.

== Distribution ==
The individuals known from this species were found in two caves, Lene Hara and Napana Wei. These caves are part of separate rock structures, but their entrances are less than 500 metres (1,600 ft) apart. Both are 152 metres (499 ft) above sea level, less than 1 kilometre (0.62 mi) from the northeast coast of Nino Konis Santana National Park. It is expected that the species also inhabit other limestone caves in the area. This park encompasses the eastern areas of East Timor's Lautém Municipality. A Cyrtodactylus specimen with a similar appearance has been found on the island of Atauro, but it is not known if it represents the same species. These areas lie within the Wallacea biogeographical region.

== Ecology ==
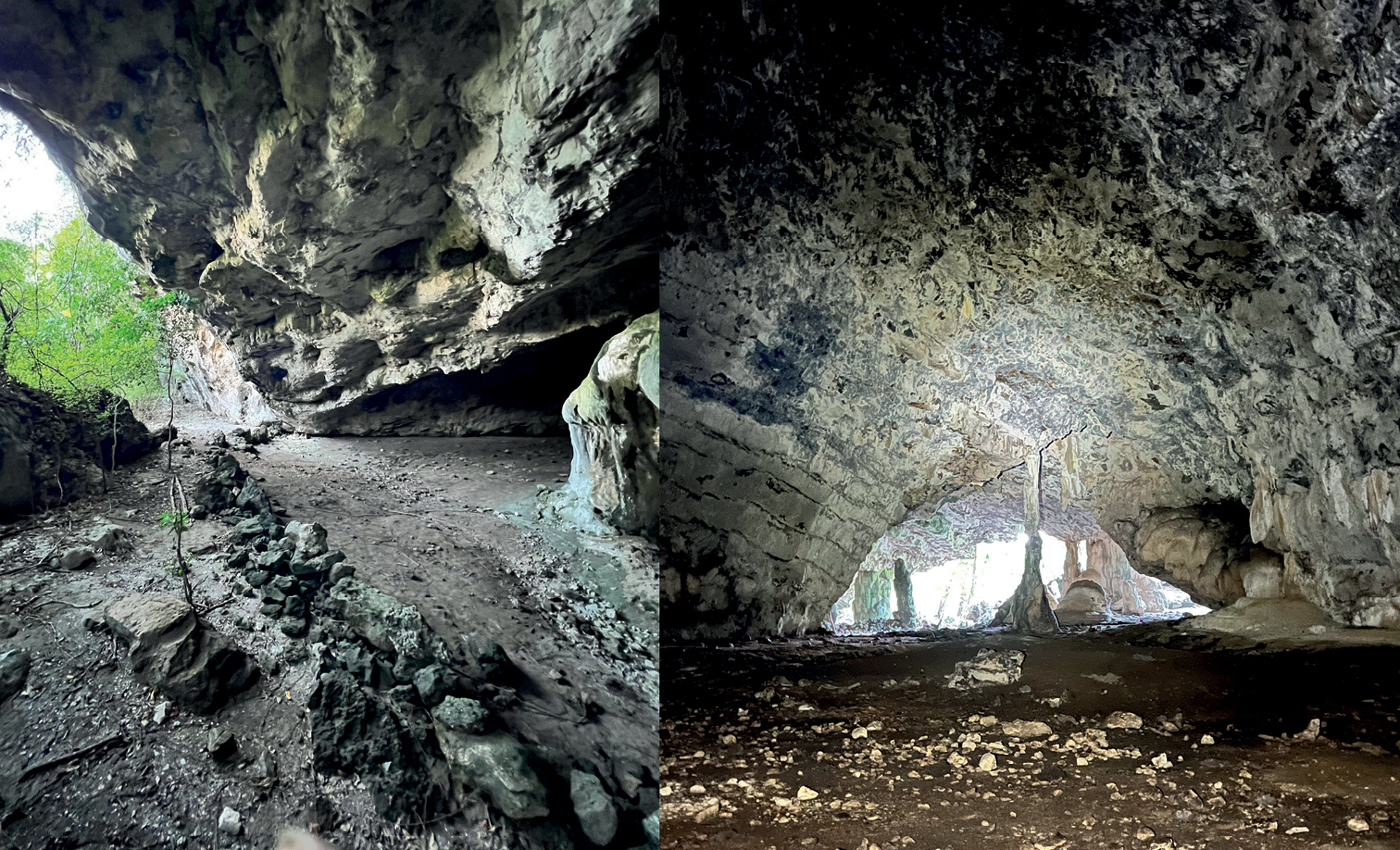
Lene Hara cave, within the Nino Konis Santana National Park

Individuals of this species live in caves, both among rocks and on exposed areas of cave walls. They share this habitat with other geckos from the Gehyra genus. It is thought that they are nocturnal, similar to other members of their genus. While they have only been seen on limestone and not on vegetation outside of the caves, it is unknown if this is a true reflection of their behaviour or a result of limited sampling.

== Gallery ==
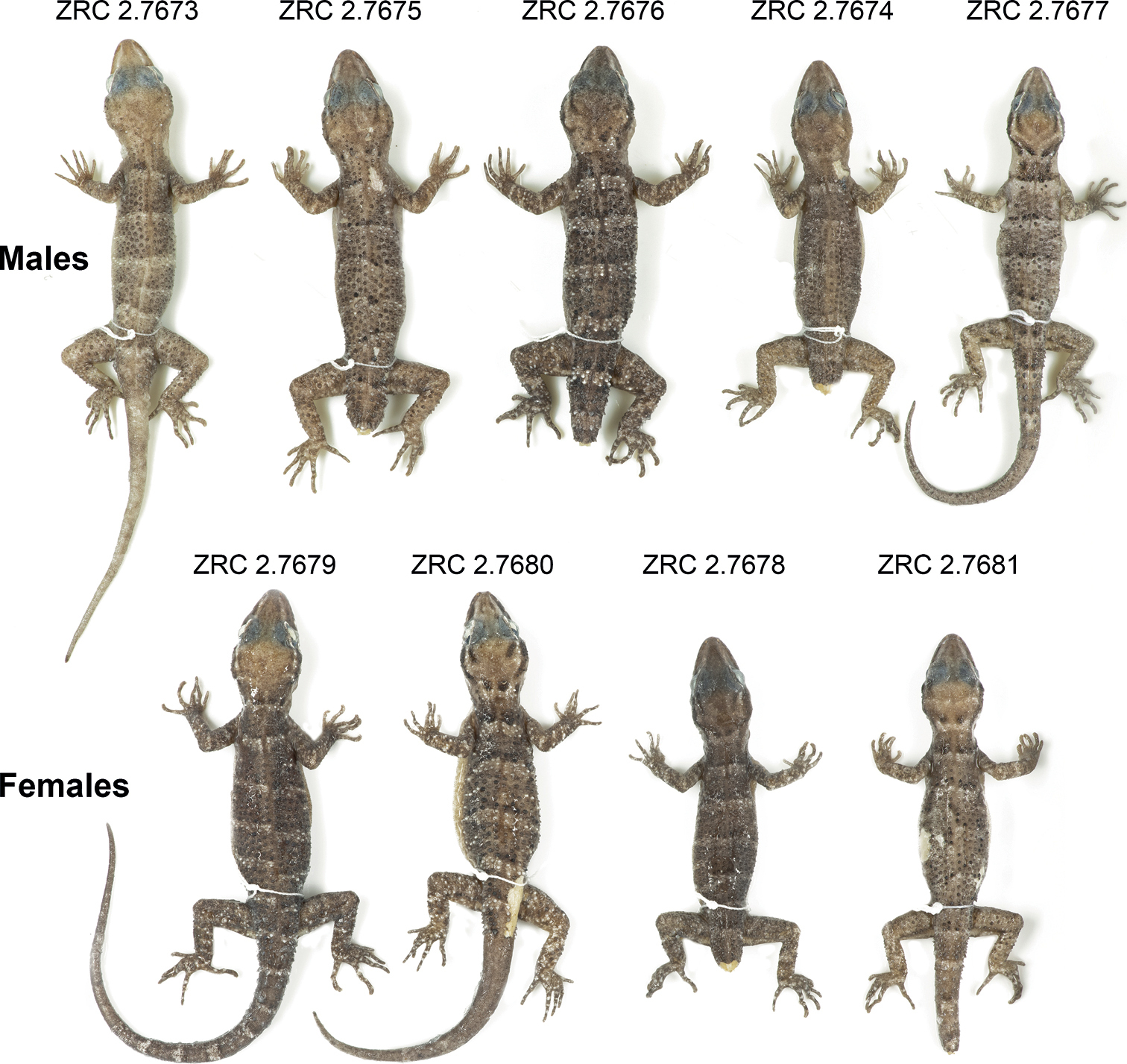
Other individuals sampled and stored at the Lee Kong Chian Natural History Museum

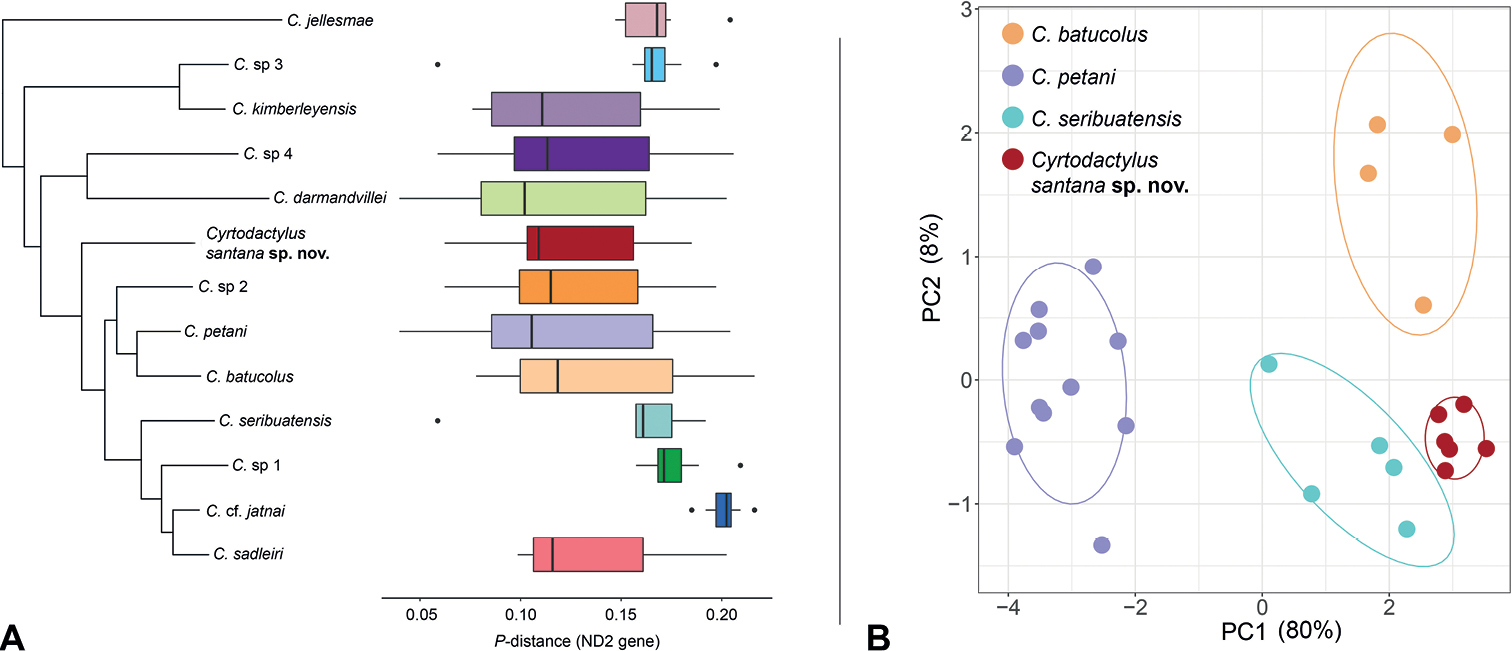
Phylogeny of closely related species and principal component analysis assessing distinctiveness from other species
