= Sulaiman Range gecko =

Conservation status
- Least Concern (IUCN 3.1)

Scientific classification
- Kingdom: Animalia
- Phylum: Chordata
- Class: Reptilia
- Order: Squamata
- Suborder: Gekkota
- Family: Gekkonidae
- Genus: Cyrtopodion
- Species: C. kohsulaimanai

Binomial name
- Cyrtopodion kohsulaimanai (Khan, 1991)
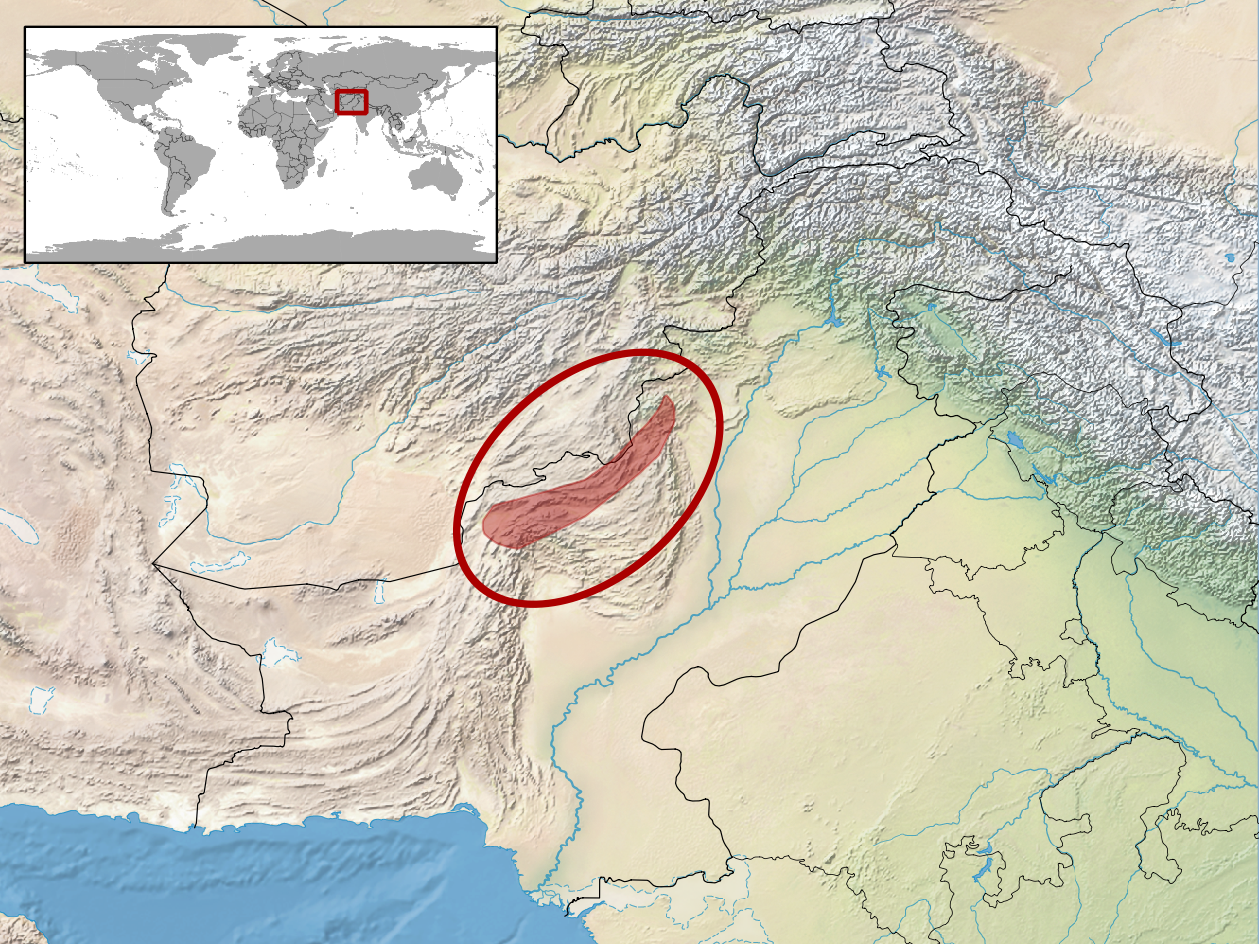

Synonyms
- Tenuidactylus kohsulaimani Khan, 1991; Cyrtopodion kohsulaimanai — Rösler, 2000

Species of lizard

The Sulaiman Range gecko (Cyrtopodion kohsulaimanai ) is a species of gecko, a lizard in the family Gekkonidae. The species is endemic to northwestern Pakistan.

== Geographic range ==
C. kohsulaimanai is found in Punjab Province, Pakistan.
