= Cyrtodactylus markuscombaii =

Conservation status
- Data Deficient (IUCN 3.1)

Scientific classification
- Kingdom: Animalia
- Phylum: Chordata
- Class: Reptilia
- Order: Squamata
- Suborder: Gekkota
- Family: Gekkonidae
- Genus: Cyrtodactylus
- Species: C. markuscombaii

Binomial name
- Cyrtodactylus markuscombaii (Darevsky, Helfenberger, Orlov & Shah, 1998)

Synonyms
- Gonydactylus markuscombaii Darevsky, Helfenberger, Orlov & Shaw, 1998; Cyrtopodion markuscombaii — Rösler, 2000; Siwaligekko markuscombaii — Khan, 2003; Cyrtodactylus marcuscombaii — Mahony et al., 2009

Species of lizard

Cyrtodactylus markuscombaii, also known commonly as the striped gecko, is a species of gecko, a lizard in the family Gekkonidae. The species is endemic to eastern Nepal.

== Etymology ==
The specific name, markuscombaii, is in honor of Markus Comba (born 1956), who is a Swiss antiquarian bookseller, book restorer, and naturalist.

== Distribution ==
Cyrtodactylus markuscombaii is known only from a single locality in eastern Nepal (Ilam District, altitude 1,200–1,300 m (3,900–4,300 ft) and is possibly a Nepalese endemite.

== Reproduction ==
Cyrtodactylus markuscombaii is oviparous.

== Taxonomy ==
In 2025 Bhattarai et al. considered Cyrtodactylus markuscombaii to be a synonym of Cyrtodactylus martinstolli.
