= Rohtas gecko =

Conservation status
- Least Concern (IUCN 3.1)

Scientific classification
- Kingdom: Animalia
- Phylum: Chordata
- Class: Reptilia
- Order: Squamata
- Suborder: Gekkota
- Family: Gekkonidae
- Genus: Cyrtopodion
- Species: C. rohtasfortai

Binomial name
- Cyrtopodion rohtasfortai (Khan & Tasnim, 1990)

Synonyms
- Tenuidactylus rohtasforti Khan & Tasnim, 1990; Gonydactylus rohtasforti — Kluge, 1991; Tenuidactylus rohtasfortai — Kluge, 1993; Cyrtopodion rohtasfortai — Rösler, 2000; Indogekko rohtasfortai — Khan, 2003; Cyrtopodion rohtasfortai — Bauer et al., 2013

Species of lizard

The Rohtas gecko (Cyrtopodion rohtasfortai) is a species of gecko, a lizard in the family Gekkonidae. The species is endemic to Pakistan.

== Geographic range ==
Within Pakistan, C. rohtasfortai occurs in southwestern Azad Kashmir and northeastern Punjab Province.

== Habitat ==
The preferred natural habitat of C. rohtasfortai is rocky areas, where it shelters in rock crevices, but it also has been found on walls of houses.

== Diet ==
C. rohtasfortai preys upon insects.

== Reproduction ==
C. rohtasfortai is an oviparous species.
