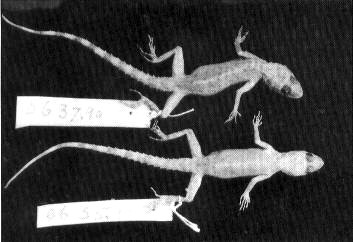

Conservation status
- Least Concern (IUCN 3.1)

Scientific classification
- Kingdom: Animalia
- Phylum: Chordata
- Class: Reptilia
- Order: Squamata
- Suborder: Gekkota
- Family: Gekkonidae
- Genus: Cyrtopodion
- Species: C. fortmunroi

Binomial name
- Cyrtopodion fortmunroi (Khan, 1993)

Synonyms
- Tenuidactylus fortmunroi Khan, 1993; Cyrtopodion fortmunroi — Rösler, 2000; Indogekko fortmunroi — Khan, 2003; Cyrtopodion (Indogekko) fortmunroi — Bauer et al., 2013

= Fort Munro sandstone gecko =

Species of lizard

The Fort Munro sandstone gecko (Cyrtopodion fortmunroi ) is a species of gecko, a lizard in the family Gekkonidae. The species is endemic to Pakistan.
