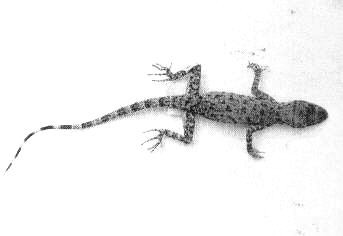

Scientific classification
- Kingdom: Animalia
- Phylum: Chordata
- Class: Reptilia
- Order: Squamata
- Suborder: Gekkota
- Family: Gekkonidae
- Genus: Cyrtopodion
- Species: C. indusoani

Binomial name
- Cyrtopodion indusoani (Khan, 1988)

Synonyms
- Cyrtodactylus indusoani Khan, 1988; Tenuidactylus indusoani — Khan, 1993; Cyrtopodion indusoani — Rösler, 2000; Indogekko indusoani — Khan, 2003; Cyrtopodion (Indogekko) indusoani — Bauer et al., 2013

= Soan gecko =

Species of lizard

The Soan gecko (Cyrtopodion indusoani ) is a species of gecko, a lizard in the family Gekkonidae. The species is endemic to Pakistan.

== Etymology ==
The specific name, indusoani, refers to two rivers, the Indus and the Soan, near the confluence of which the holotype specimen was collected.

== Geographic range ==
C. indusoani is found in Punjab Province, Pakistan.
