= Bent-toed gecko =

Bent-toed gecko may refer to geckos in the following genera:

- Cyrtopodion
- Cyrtodactylus
