= Cyrtopodion potoharense =

Conservation status
- Least Concern (IUCN 3.1)

Scientific classification
- Kingdom: Animalia
- Phylum: Chordata
- Class: Reptilia
- Order: Squamata
- Suborder: Gekkota
- Family: Gekkonidae
- Genus: Cyrtopodion
- Species: C. potoharense

Binomial name
- Cyrtopodion potoharense Khan, 2001
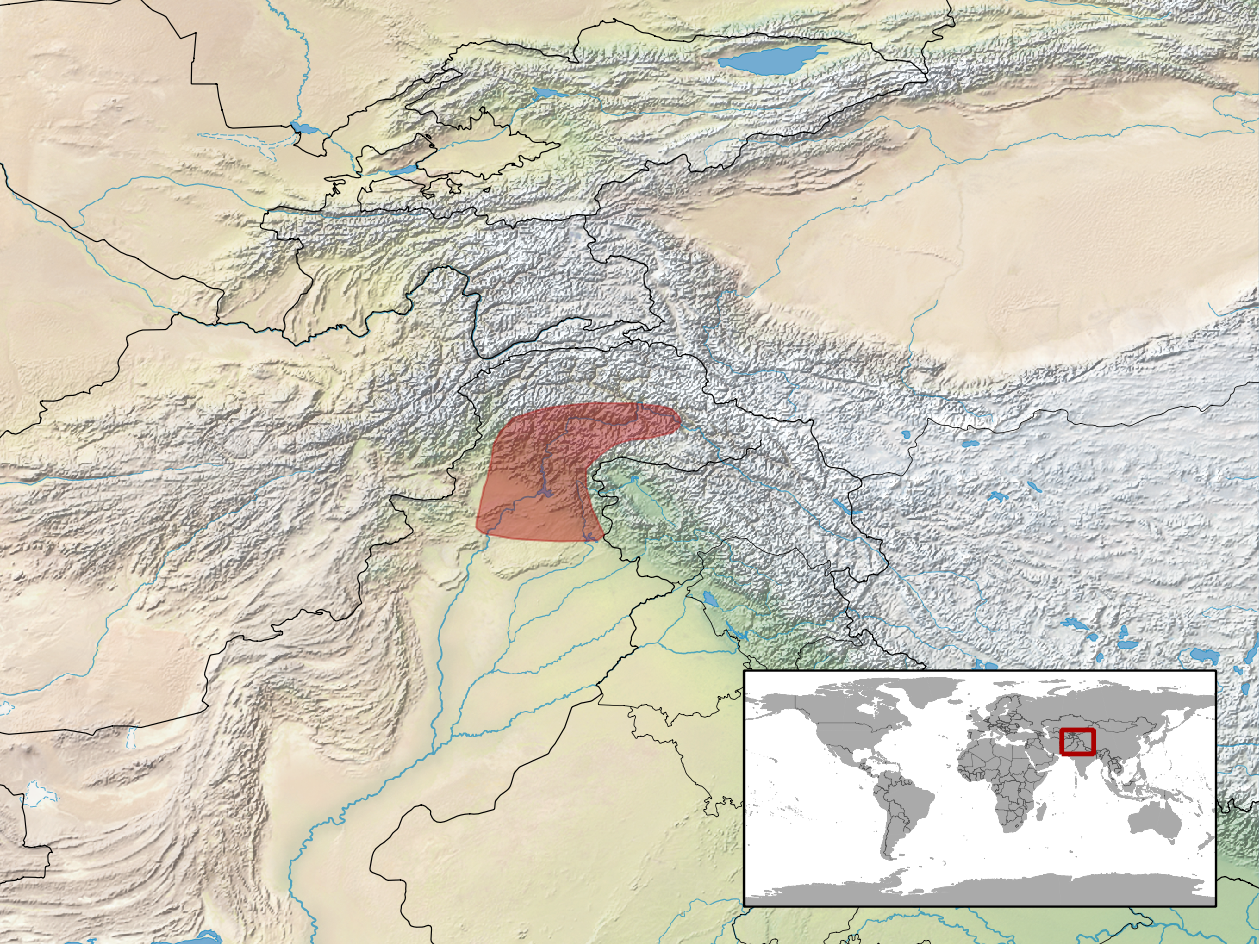

Synonyms
- Cyrtopodion potoharensis [sic]

Species of lizard

Cyrtopodion potoharense, commonly known as the Potahar gecko or the Potwar gecko, is a species of lizard in the family Gekkonidae. The species is endemic to northern Pakistan.

== Geographic range ==
C. potoharense is found in Rawalpindi District, Punjab Province, Pakistan.

== Habitat ==
The natural habitat of C. potoharense is mud flats.

== Reproduction ==
C. potoharense is oviparous.
