= Indotyphlops ahsanai =

Conservation status
- Data Deficient (IUCN 3.1)

Scientific classification
- Kingdom: Animalia
- Phylum: Chordata
- Class: Reptilia
- Order: Squamata
- Suborder: Serpentes
- Family: Typhlopidae
- Genus: Indotyphlops
- Species: I. ahsanai

Binomial name
- Indotyphlops ahsanai (Khan, 1999)

Synonyms
- Typhlops ahsanai Khan, 1999; Indotyphlops ahsanai — Hedges et al., 2014

Species of snake

Indotyphlops ahsanai is a species of snake in the family Typhlopidae. The species is endemic to Pakistan. Its taxonomic status is uncertain.

== Etymology ==
The specific name, ahsanai, is in honor of Pakistani zoologist Ahsanul-Islam (1927–1974).

== Geographic range ==
I. ahsanai is found in Kotli district in the province of Punjab, Pakistan.
