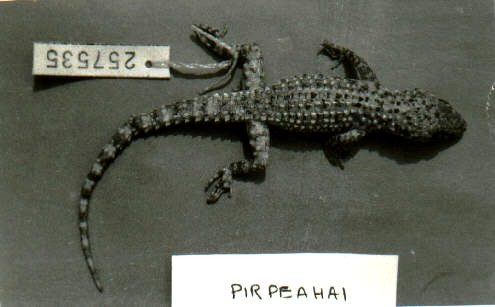

Scientific classification
- Kingdom: Animalia
- Phylum: Chordata
- Class: Reptilia
- Order: Squamata
- Suborder: Gekkota
- Family: Gekkonidae
- Genus: Cyrtopodion
- Species: C. montiumsalsorum

Binomial name
- Cyrtopodion montiumsalsorum (Annandale, 1913)

Synonyms
- Gymnodactylus montium-salsorum Annandale, 1913; Tenuidactylus montiumsalsorum — Khan, 1989; Cyrtopodion montiumsalsorum — Rösler, 2000

= Salt Range gecko =

Species of lizard

The Salt Range gecko (Cyrtopodion montiumsalsorum) is a species of gecko, a lizard in the family Gekkonidae. The species is endemic to northern Pakistan.

== Geographic range ==
C. montiumsalsorum is found in the Salt Range of Punjab province, Pakistan. It may also occur in northern India.

== Reproduction ==
C. montiumsalsorum is oviparous.
