= Cyrtodactylus pecelmadiun =

Scientific classification
- Kingdom: Animalia
- Phylum: Chordata
- Class: Reptilia
- Order: Squamata
- Suborder: Gekkota
- Family: Gekkonidae
- Genus: Cyrtodactylus
- Species: C. pecelmadiun

Binomial name
- Cyrtodactylus pecelmadiun Riyanto, Sidik, Hamidy, Grismer & Abinawanto, 2025

Species of gecko

Cyrtodactylus pecelmadiun, commonly known as Pecelmadiun's bent-toed gecko, is a species of bent-toed gecko in the family Gekkonidae. It is endemic to East Java, Indonesia, and has been recorded from Magetan Regency and Mojokerto Regency. The species is distinguished by its coloration, the arrangement of its tubercles, and sexual dimorphism in the precloacal structures. It was described by the herpetologist Awal Riyanto and colleagues in 2025 and named after pecel Madiun, a traditional Javanese dish.

== Taxonomy ==
Cyrtodactylus pecelmadiun was formally described in 2025 in the journal Zootaxa by Awal Riyanto, Irvan Sidik, Amir Hamidy, L. Lee Grismer and Abinawanto. The holotype (MZB Lace 15689) is an adult male collected on 9 May 2023 at Tanjungsepreh Village, Maospati District, Magetan Regency, by Awal Riyanto and Asrael Racho.

The specific epithet is a noun in apposition formed from "pecel" and "madiun". The name refers to pecel Madiun, a Javanese salad with peanut sauce that originates from Madiun in East Java. Riyanto stated that the researchers wished to introduce Indonesia's culinary diversity through science.

Phylogenetically, the species is closely related to Cyrtodactylus petani, with a genetic distance of 0.1–1.6%. It belongs to the darmandvillei group and the sadleiri complex, and it is the second member of the darmandvillei group known from Java after C. petani. It differs statistically from C. petani in several morphometric and meristic characters.

== Description ==
Adult males reach a snout–vent length (SVL) of up to 67.2 mm, while females reach a maximum of 59.0 mm. The species has small tubercles on the antebrachial folds and in the ventrolateral region, but none on the brachial folds.

At midbody there are 18–20 irregularly arranged rows of dorsal tubercles, with 26–28 paravertebral tubercles per row. The ventral surface is covered by 28–34 rows of ventral scales. Males have a precloacal groove and 32–37 precloacofemoral pores, whereas females lack these structures.

The tail of the holotype is regenerated, while several paratypes retain their original tails. The species has a brown pattern with broad black borders, bright yellow markings on the back, distinctive yellow spots on the labial scales, and greenish-yellow irises.

== Distribution and habitat ==
The species is known only from East Java, with specimens collected in Maospati District, Magetan Regency (about 137 m above sea level), and in Mojosari, Mojokerto Regency (about 60 m above sea level), in March and May 2023. It is listed in the Reptile Database with a distribution of East Java.

According to Riyanto, the gecko occurs in urban environments such as embankments of bridges, piles of roof tiles, and gardens in village settlements. It is found no higher than about 40 cm above the ground in environments close to human activity, which led the researchers to consider it a habitat generalist.
