= Blanford's short-toed gecko =

Conservation status
- Least Concern (IUCN 3.1)

Scientific classification
- Kingdom: Animalia
- Phylum: Chordata
- Class: Reptilia
- Order: Squamata
- Suborder: Gekkota
- Family: Gekkonidae
- Genus: Cyrtopodion
- Species: C. brevipes

Binomial name
- Cyrtopodion brevipes (Blanford, 1874)
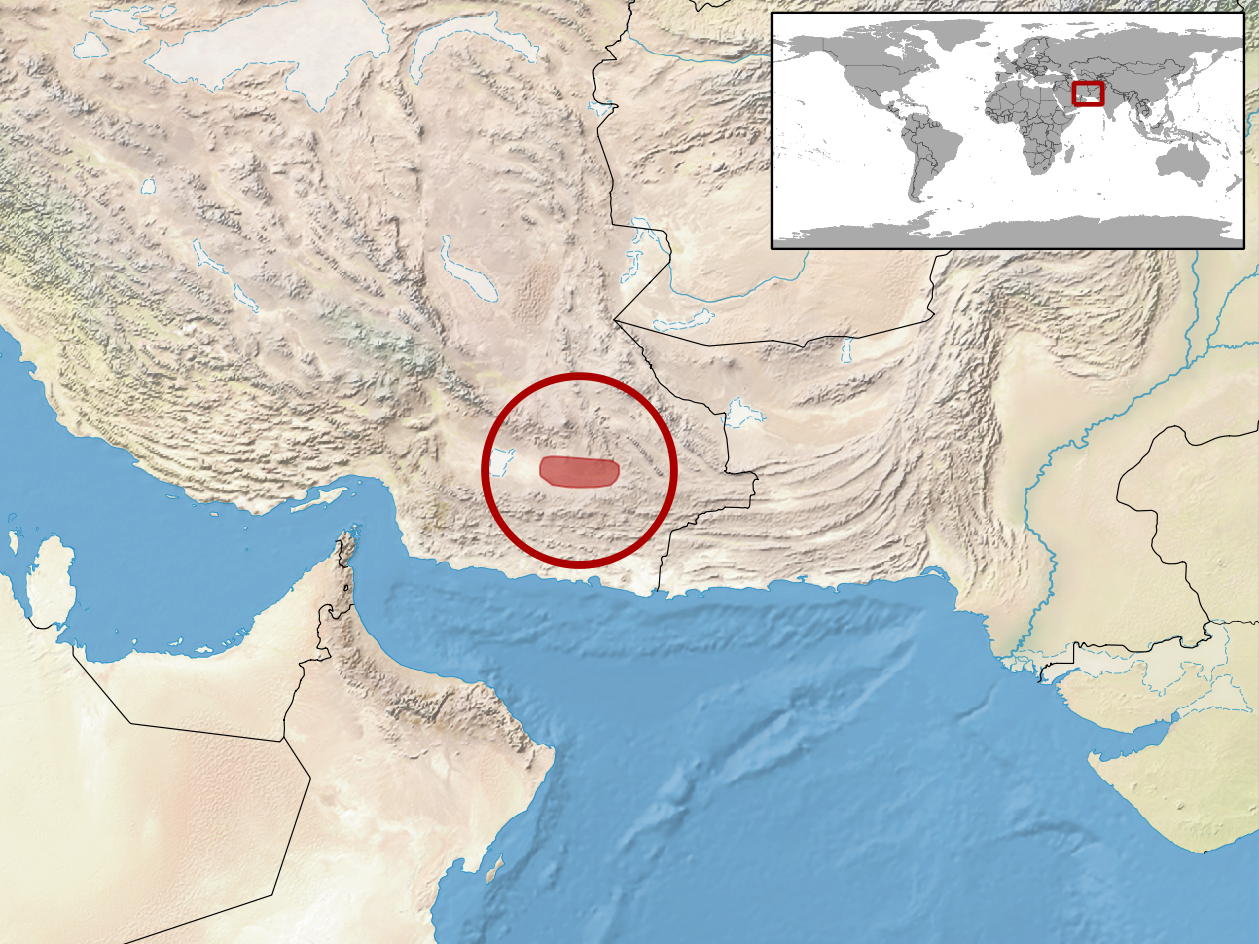

Synonyms
- Gymnodactylus brevipes Blanford, 1874; Cyrtodactylus brevipes — S. Anderson, 1963; Mediodactylus brevipes — Kluge, 1993; Cyrtopodion brevipes — Rösler, 2000

Species of lizard

Blanford's short-toed gecko (Cyrtopodion brevipes) is a species of gecko, a lizard in the family Gekkonidae. The species is endemic to southeastern Iran.

== Geographic range ==
In Iran, C. brevipes is found in the province of Sistan and Baluchestan.
