= Cyrtopodion kachhense =

Conservation status
- Least Concern (IUCN 3.1)

Scientific classification
- Kingdom: Animalia
- Phylum: Chordata
- Class: Reptilia
- Order: Squamata
- Suborder: Gekkota
- Family: Gekkonidae
- Genus: Cyrtopodion
- Species: C. kachhense

Binomial name
- Cyrtopodion kachhense (Stoliczka, 1872)

Synonyms
- Gymnodactylus kachhensis Stoliczka, 1872; Tenuidactylus kachhensis — Khan & Tasnim, 1990; Cyrtopodion kachhensis — Rösler, 1995; Cyrtopodion kachhense — S. Anderson, 1999

Species of lizard

Cyrtopodion kachhense, also known commonly as the Kachh gecko, the warty rock gecko, the ingoldbyi western ground gecko, and Ingoldby's stone gecko, is a species of gecko, a lizard in the family Gekkonidae. The species is endemic to South Asia.

== Taxonomy ==
Originally described as Gymnodactylus kachensis, this species was reassigned to the genus Tenuidactylus, and then later to the genus Cyrtopodion. The generic names, Gymnodactylus and Tenuidactylus are masculine, but the generic name, Cyrtopodion is neuter. Therefore, the specific name, kachhensis (masculine), had to be changed to kachhense (neuter) to agree in gender with Cyrtopodion.

== Habitat ==
The preferred natural habitats of C. kachhense are caves, rocky areas, and shrubland.

== Reproduction ==
C. kachhense is oviparous.

== Subspecies ==
Two subspecies are recognized as being valid, including the nominotypical subspecies.

- Cyrtopodion kachhense ingoldbyi (Procter, 1923)
- Cyrtopodion kachhense kachhense (Stoliczka, 1872)

Nota bene: A trinomial authority in parentheses indicates that the subspecies was originally described in a genus other than Cyrtopodion.

== Etymology ==
The subspecific name, ingoldbyi, is in honor of Captain Christopher Martin Ingoldby (1887–1927), who was an officer in the British Army Medical Services and collected zoological specimens.

== Geographic range ==
The species, C. kachhense, is found in Pakistan (Sindh, Balochistan), adjacent India (Kachchh, Gujarat), and Iran.

The subspecies, C. k. ingoldbyi, is widely distributed in the Sulaiman Range extending into the Waziristan Hills, along the western border of Punjab, Pakistan.

The type locality of the species is "Ladha" (= Ladha, Dera Ismael Khan District, southeastern North Western Frontier Province, Pakistan).
