= Cyrtopodion medogense =

Scientific classification
- Kingdom: Animalia
- Phylum: Chordata
- Class: Reptilia
- Order: Squamata
- Suborder: Gekkota
- Family: Gekkonidae
- Genus: Cyrtopodion
- Species: C. medogense

Binomial name
- Cyrtopodion medogense (Zhao & Li, 1987)

Synonyms
- Tenuidactylus medogensis Zhao & Li, 1987; Cyrtodactylus medogensis — Zhao & Adler, 1993; Cyrtopodion medogensis — Rösler, 2000; Cyrtopodion medogense — Frost, 2007

Species of lizard

Cyrtopodion medogense is a species of gecko, a lizard in the family Gekkonidae. The species is endemic to western China.

== Geographic range ==
C. medogense is found in the Tibet Autonomous Region of China.

== Reproduction ==
C. medogense is oviparous.
