= Indotyphlops madgemintonae =

Conservation status
- Data Deficient (IUCN 3.1)

Scientific classification
- Kingdom: Animalia
- Phylum: Chordata
- Class: Reptilia
- Order: Squamata
- Suborder: Serpentes
- Family: Typhlopidae
- Genus: Indotyphlops
- Species: I. madgemintonae

Binomial name
- Indotyphlops madgemintonae (Khan, 1999)

Synonyms
- Typhlops madgemintonai Khan, 1999; Typhlops madgemintonae — Wallach, 2000 (emendation); Indotyphlops madgemintonae — Hedges et al., 2014

Species of snake

Indotyphlops madgemintonae is a species of blind snake in the family Typhlopidae. The species is endemic to Pakistan. There are two recognized subspecies.

== Subspecies ==
Two subspecies are recognized as being valid, including the nominotypical subspecies.

- Indotyphlops madgemintonae madgemintonae (Khan, 1999)
- Indotyphlops madgemintonae shermani (Khan, 1999)

Nota bene: A trinomial authority in parentheses indicates that the subspecies was originally described in a genus other than Indotyphlops.

== Etymology ==
The specific name, madgemintonae (genitive, feminine, singular), is in honor of Madge Alice Shortridge Rutherford Minton (1920–2004), the wife of American herpetologist Sherman A. Minton. The subspecific name, shermani (genitive, masculine, singular), is in honor of Sherman A. Minton.

== Description ==
Dorsally, Indotyphlops madgemintonae is dark brown. Ventrally, it is light brown. It has 336–364 dorsal scales in the vertebral row. The tail ends in a spine.

== Geographic range ==
Indotyphlops madgemintonae is found in the Kashmir region of Pakistan.

== Habitat ==
The preferred natural habitat of Indotyphlops madgemintoni is pine forest, at altitudes up to 1,315 m (4,314 ft).

== Reproduction ==
Indotyphlops madgemintonae is oviparous.
