= Cyrtopodion kirmanense =

Conservation status
- Least Concern (IUCN 3.1)

Scientific classification
- Kingdom: Animalia
- Phylum: Chordata
- Class: Reptilia
- Order: Squamata
- Suborder: Gekkota
- Family: Gekkonidae
- Genus: Cyrtopodion
- Species: C. kirmanense

Binomial name
- Cyrtopodion kirmanense (Nikolsky, 1900)
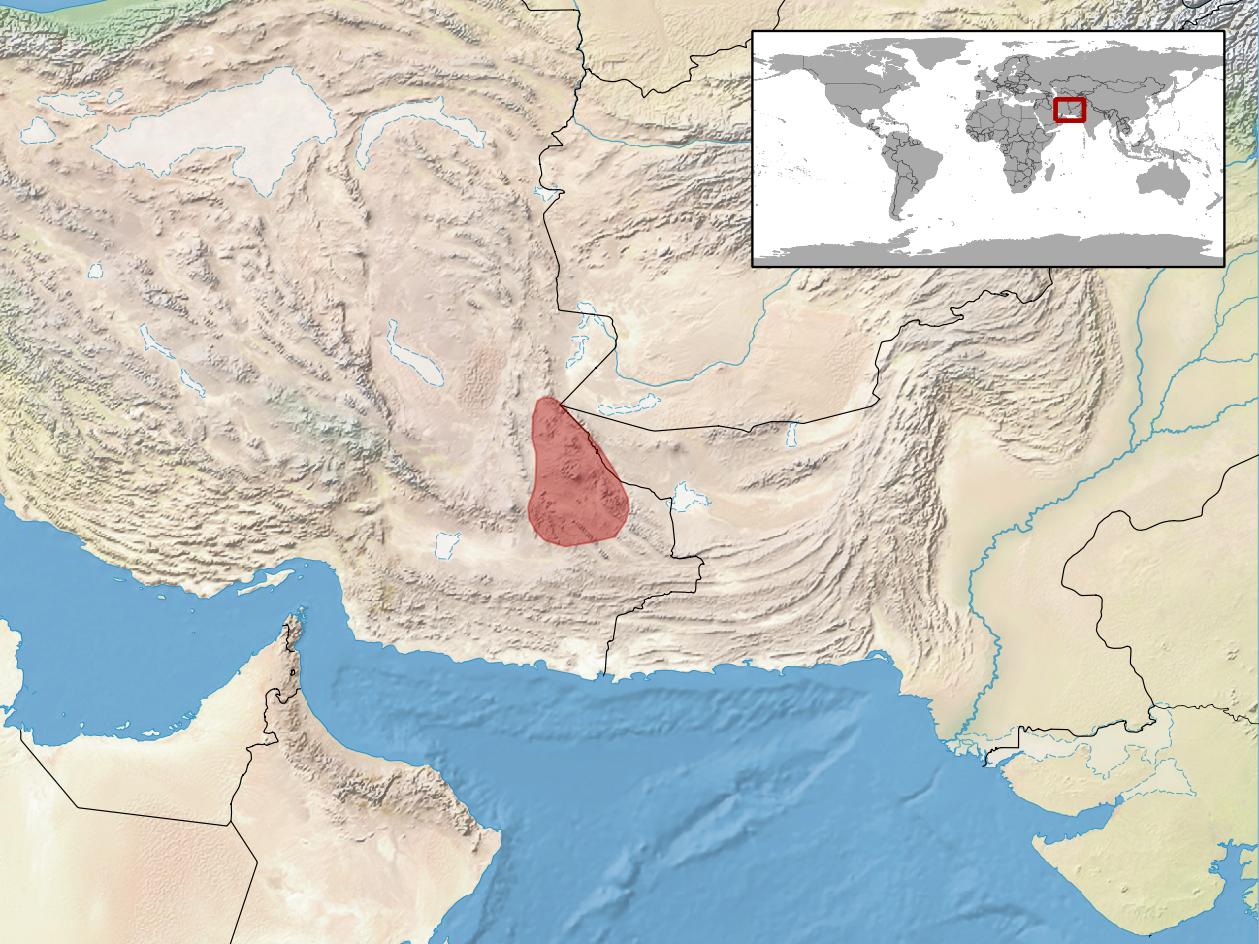

Synonyms
- Gymnodactylus kirmanensis Nikolsky, 1900; Cyrtodactylys kirmanensis — S. Anderson, 1963; Tenuidactylus kirmanensis — Szczerbak & Golubev, 1984; Cyrtopodion kirmanensis — Rösler, 2000; Mediodactylus kirmanense — Nazarov et al., 2011

Species of lizard

Cyrtopodion kirmanense, also known as the Kirman thin-toed gecko or the Kerman bent-toed gecko, is a species of gecko, a lizard in the family Gekkonidae. The species is endemic to eastern Iran.

== Geographic range ==
C. kirmanense is found in Kerman Province, Iran.
