= Phelsuma roesleri =

Conservation status
- Endangered (IUCN 3.1)

Scientific classification
- Kingdom: Animalia
- Phylum: Chordata
- Class: Reptilia
- Order: Squamata
- Suborder: Gekkota
- Family: Gekkonidae
- Genus: Phelsuma
- Species: P. roesleri

Binomial name
- Phelsuma roesleri Glaw, Gehring, J. Köhler, Franzen & Vences, 2010
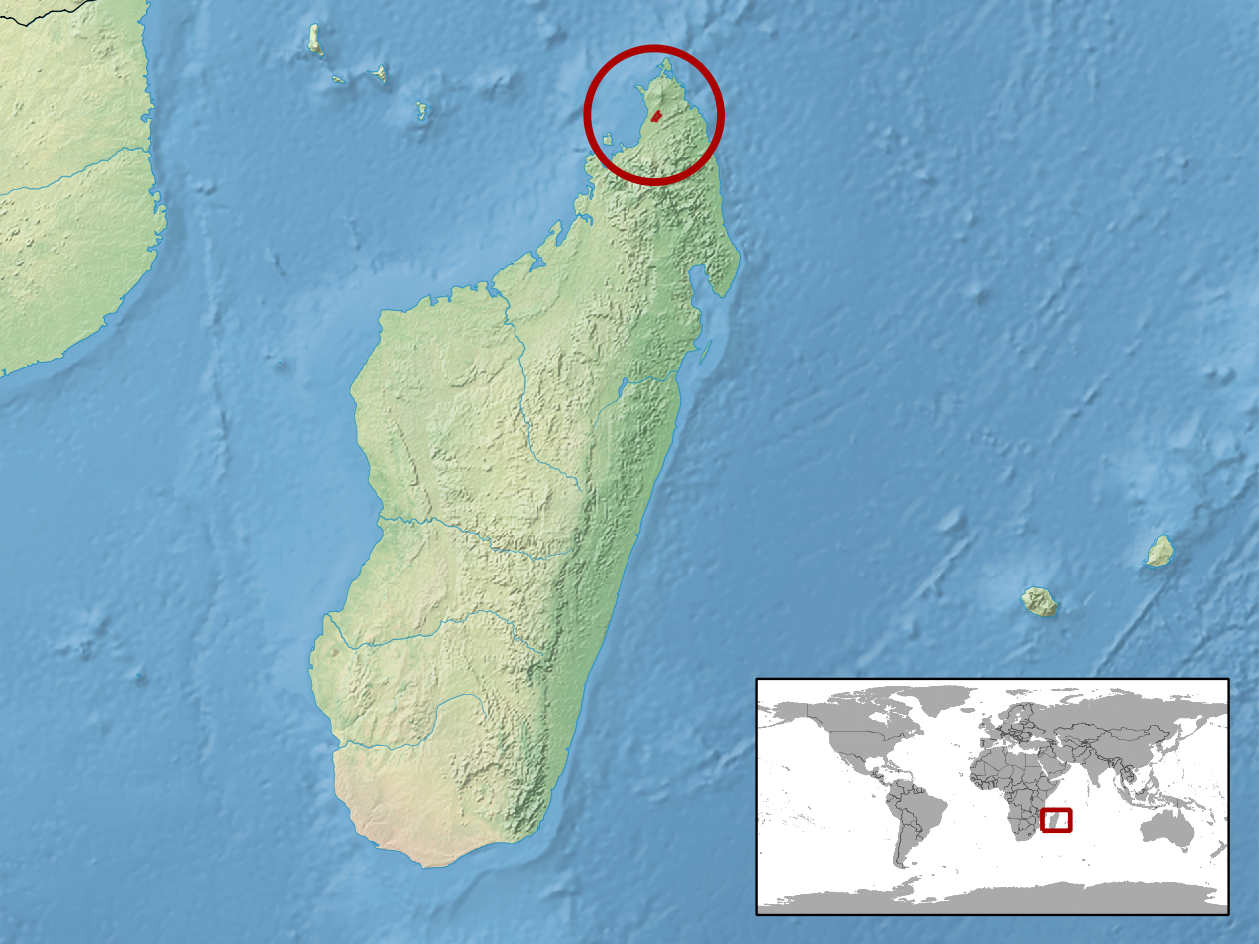

Species of lizard

Phelsuma roesleri, also known commonly as Rösler's day gecko, is a species of lizard in the family Gekkonidae. The species is endemic to Madagascar.

== Etymology ==
The specific name, roesleri, is in honor of German herpetologist Herbert Rösler (born 1952).

== Geographic range ==
P. roesleri is found in the Diana Region of extreme northern Madagascar.

== Habitat ==
The natural habitat of P. roesleri is forest at an altitude of 128 m (420 ft).

== Description ==
Small for its genus, the maximum recorded snout-to-vent length (SVL) for P. roesleri is 36 mm (1.4 in), and the maximum recorded total length (including tail) is 72 mm (2.8 in).
