= Delhi rock gecko =

Scientific classification
- Kingdom: Animalia
- Phylum: Chordata
- Class: Reptilia
- Order: Squamata
- Suborder: Gekkota
- Family: Gekkonidae
- Genus: Cyrtopodion
- Species: C. aravallensis

Binomial name
- Cyrtopodion aravallensis (Gill, 1997)

Synonyms
- Cyrtodactylus aravallensis Gill, 1997; Cyrtopodion aravallense — Kluge, 2003

Species of lizard

The Delhi rock gecko (Cyrtopodion aravallensis) is a species of gecko, a lizard in the family Gekkonidae. The species is endemic to northern India.

== Geographic range ==
C. aravallensis is found in the Delhi Ridge in India.

== Taxonomy ==
Cyrtopodion aravallensis was originally described in the genus Cyrtodactylus.
