= Cyrtopodion hormozganum =

Scientific classification
- Kingdom: Animalia
- Phylum: Chordata
- Class: Reptilia
- Order: Squamata
- Suborder: Gekkota
- Family: Gekkonidae
- Genus: Cyrtopodion
- Species: C. hormozganum

Binomial name
- Cyrtopodion hormozganum Nazarov, Bondarenko & Radjabizadeh, 2012

Species of lizard

Cyrtopodion hormozganum is a species of gecko, a lizard in the family Gekkonidae. The species is endemic to Iran.

== Geographic range ==
C. hormozganum is found in Hormozgan province, Iran.
