= White-headed blind snake =

Conservation status
- Least Concern (IUCN 3.1)

Scientific classification
- Kingdom: Animalia
- Phylum: Chordata
- Class: Reptilia
- Order: Squamata
- Suborder: Serpentes
- Family: Typhlopidae
- Genus: Indotyphlops
- Species: I. albiceps

Binomial name
- Indotyphlops albiceps (Boulenger, 1898)

Synonyms
- Typhlops albiceps; Typhlops malaisei; Ramphotyphlops albiceps

Species of snake

The white-headed blind snake (Indotyphlops albiceps) is a species of snake in the Typhlopidae family.
