= Cyrtopodion baigii =

Scientific classification
- Kingdom: Animalia
- Phylum: Chordata
- Class: Reptilia
- Order: Squamata
- Suborder: Gekkota
- Family: Gekkonidae
- Genus: Cyrtopodion
- Species: C. baigii

Binomial name
- Cyrtopodion baigii Masroor, 2008

Species of lizard

Cyrtopodion baigii is a species of gecko, a lizard in the family Gekkonidae. The species is endemic to Pakistan.

== Etymology ==
The specific name, baigii, is in honor of Pakistani herpetologist Khalid Javed Baig (1956–2006).

== Geographic range ==
C. baigii is found in northern Pakistan, in Astore District, Gilgit-Baltistan territory.

== Reproduction ==
C. baigii is oviparous.
