= Cyrtopodion agamuroides =

Conservation status
- Least Concern (IUCN 3.1)

Scientific classification
- Kingdom: Animalia
- Phylum: Chordata
- Class: Reptilia
- Order: Squamata
- Suborder: Gekkota
- Family: Gekkonidae
- Genus: Cyrtopodion
- Species: C. agamuroides

Binomial name
- Cyrtopodion agamuroides (Nikolsky, 1900)
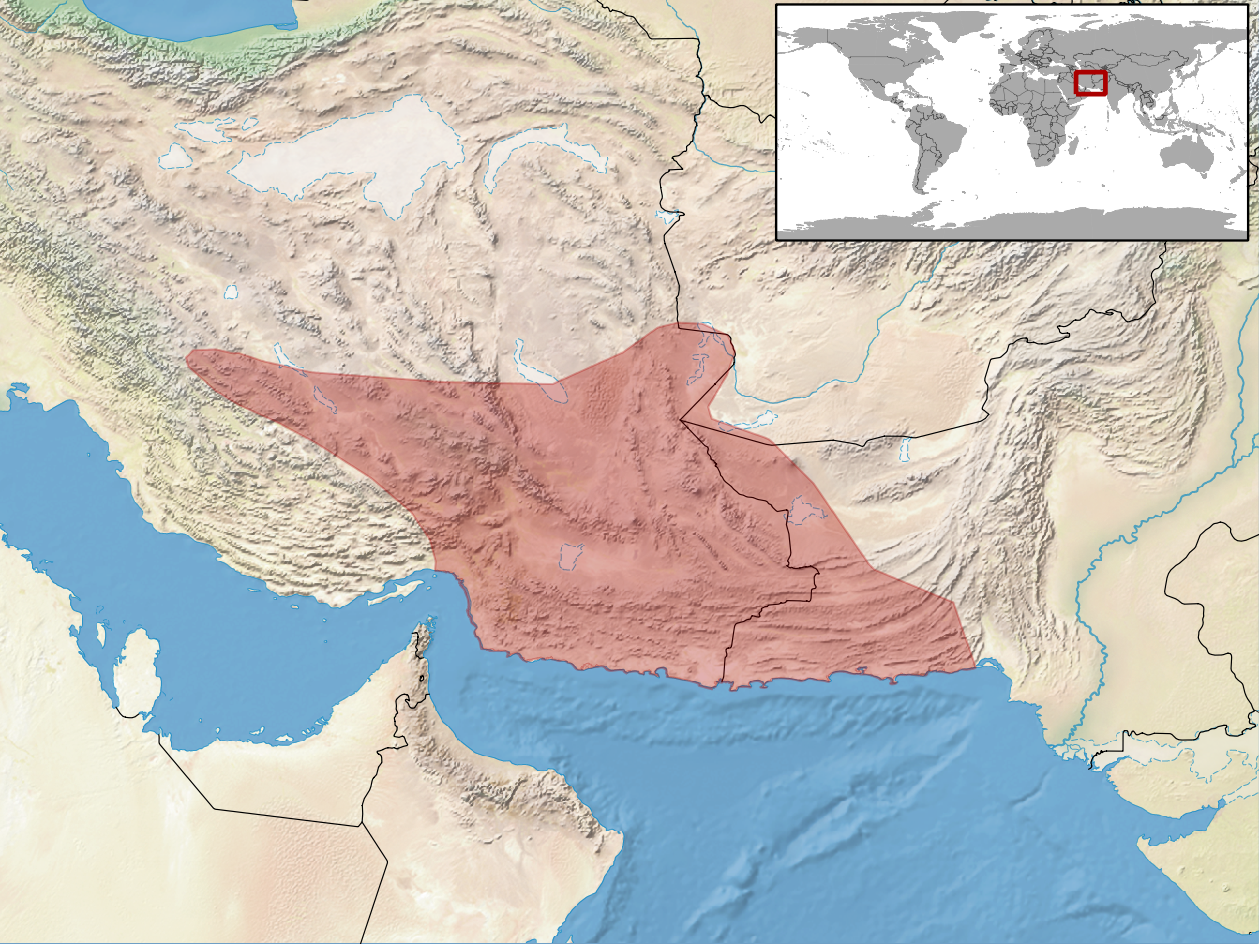

Synonyms
- Gymnodactylus agamuroides Nikolsky, 1900; Cyrtodactylus agamuroides — S. Anderson, 1963; Agamura agamuroides — Minton, 1966; Cyrtopodion agamuroides — Kluge, 1993

Species of lizard

Cyrtopodion agamuroides, also known by the common names Nikolsky's spider gecko, Nikolsky's Iranian gecko, or the Makran spider gecko, is a species of gecko, a lizard in the family Gekkonidae. The species is endemic to eastern Iran and Pakistan.
