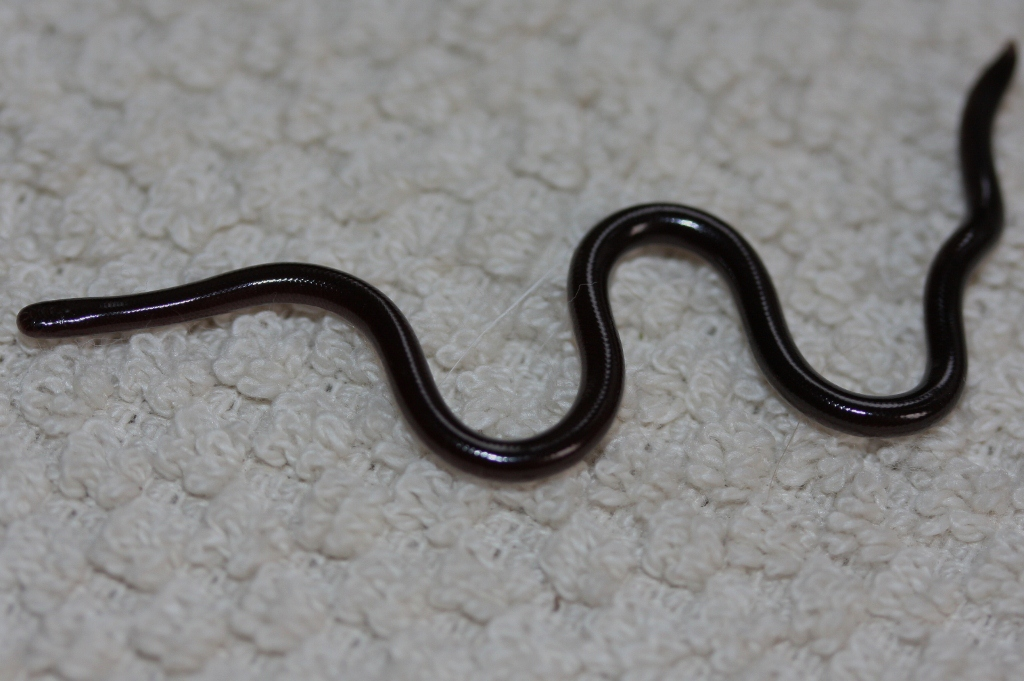
- Indotyphlops braminus

Scientific classification
- Kingdom: Animalia
- Phylum: Chordata
- Class: Reptilia
- Order: Squamata
- Suborder: Serpentes
- Family: Typhlopidae
- Subfamily: Asiatyphlopinae
- Genus: Indotyphlops; Hedges, Marion, Lipp, Marin & Vidal, 2014

= Indotyphlops =

Genus of snakes

Indotyphlops is a genus of snakes of the family Typhlopidae. The genus is endemic to Asia. Its name derived from Greek means "Indian with unseen eyes".

== Species ==
The genus Indotyphlops contains the following 23 species which are recognized as being valid.

- Indotyphlops ahsanai (Khan, 1999)
- Indotyphlops albiceps (Boulenger, 1898) – white-headed blind snake
- Indotyphlops braminus (Daudin, 1803) – flowerpot snake, Brahminy blindsnake, bootlace snake, wolf flowerpot snake
- Indotyphlops exiguus (Jan, 1864) – Belgaum worm snake
- Indotyphlops filiformis (A.M.C. Duméril & Bibron, 1844) – file worm snake
- Indotyphlops fletcheri (Wall, 1919)
- Indotyphlops jerdoni (Boulenger, 1890) – Jerdon's worm snake
- Indotyphlops laca O'Shea, Wallach, Hsiao & Kaiser, 2023 – Laca's worm snake
- Indotyphlops lankaensis (Taylor, 1947) – Sri Lanka worm snake
- Indotyphlops lazelli (Wallach & Pauwels, 2004)
- Indotyphlops leucomelas (Boulenger, 1890) – pied worm snake
- Indotyphlops longissimus (A.M.C. Duméril & Bibron, 1844) – long worm snake
- Indotyphlops loveridgei (Constable, 1949) – Loveridge's worm snake
- Indotyphlops madgemintonae (Khan, 1999)
- Indotyphlops malcolmi (Taylor, 1947) – Malcolm's worm snake
- Indotyphlops meszoelyi (Wallach, 1999) – Darjeeling worm snake
- Indotyphlops mollyozakiae (Wallach, 2020) – Molly Ozaki’s blind snake
- Indotyphlops pammeces (Günther, 1864) – South India worm snake
- Indotyphlops porrectus (Stoliczka, 1871) – slender worm snake
- Indotyphlops schmutzi (Auffenberg, 1980) – Schmutz's worm snake
- Indotyphlops tenebrarum (Taylor, 1947)
- Indotyphlops tenuicollis (W. Peters, 1864) – Samagutin worm snake
- Indotyphlops veddae (Taylor, 1947) – Vedda worm snake
- Indotyphlops violaceus (Taylor, 1947) – violet worm Snake

Nota bene: A binomial authority in parentheses indicates that the species was originally described in a genus other than Indotyphlops.
