= Indotyphlops tenuicollis =

Conservation status
- Data Deficient (IUCN 3.1)

Scientific classification
- Kingdom: Animalia
- Phylum: Chordata
- Class: Reptilia
- Order: Squamata
- Suborder: Serpentes
- Family: Typhlopidae
- Genus: Indotyphlops
- Species: I. tenuicollis

Binomial name
- Indotyphlops tenuicollis (Peters, 1864)

Synonyms
- Onychocephalus (Opthalmidion) tenuicollis - Peters, 1864; Typhlops Theobaldianus - Stoliczka, 1871; T[yphlops]. Theobaldanus - Theobald, 1876; T[yphlops]. tenuicollis - Theobald, 1876; Typhlops theobaldianus - Boulenger, 1893; Typhlops tenuicollis - Boulenger, 1893

Species of snake

Indotyphlops tenuicollis, the Samagutin worm snake, is a harmless blind snake species found in northern India. No subspecies are currently recognized.

== Geographic range ==
Definitely only known from Nagaland in northern India. The type locality given is "angelich aus dem Himalaya" (Himalayas).
