= Indotyphlops jerdoni =

Conservation status
- Least Concern (IUCN 3.1)

Scientific classification
- Kingdom: Animalia
- Phylum: Chordata
- Class: Reptilia
- Order: Squamata
- Suborder: Serpentes
- Family: Typhlopidae
- Genus: Indotyphlops
- Species: I. jerdoni

Binomial name
- Indotyphlops jerdoni (Boulenger, 1890)

Synonyms
- Typhlops jerdoni Boulenger, 1890; Typhlops jerdoni Boulenger, 1893; Typhlops diversiceps Annandale, 1912; Typhlops jerdonii Bourret, 1936; Typhlops jerdoni Hahn, 1980; Indotyphlops jerdoni Hedges et al., 2014

Species of snake

Indotyphlops jerdoni, or Jerdon's worm snake, is a species of harmless blind snake in the family Typhlopidae. The species is endemic to India. There are no subspecies which are recognized as being valid.

== Etymology ==
The specific name, jerdoni, is in honor of British biologist Thomas C. Jerdon.

== Geographic range ==
I. jerdoni is found in eastern and northern India in Sikkim, northern West Bengal, Seven Sisters [Assam], and Meghalaya. Possibly, it also occurs in Bangladesh and Myanmar (Pegu).

The type locality given is "Khási Hills".

== Habitat ==
The preferred natural habitat of I. jerdoni is forest, but it has also been found in plantations.

== Reproduction ==
I. jerdoni is oviparous.
