= Indotyphlops meszoelyi =

Conservation status
- Data Deficient (IUCN 3.1)

Scientific classification
- Kingdom: Animalia
- Phylum: Chordata
- Class: Reptilia
- Order: Squamata
- Suborder: Serpentes
- Family: Typhlopidae
- Genus: Indotyphlops
- Species: I. meszoelyi

Binomial name
- Indotyphlops meszoelyi (Wallach, 1999)

Synonyms
- Typhlops meszoelyi Wallach, 1999; Indotyphlops meszoelyi — Hedges et al., 2014

Species of snake

Indotyphlops meszoelyi, the Darjeeling worm snake or Meszoely's blind snake, is a species of snake in the family Typhlopidae. The species is endemic to Darjeeling, West Bengal Province, India.

== Etymology ==
Indotyphlops meszoelyi was named after American paleontologist Charles A.M. Meszoely (1933–2020) of the Center for Vertebrate Studies at Northeastern University in Boston, Massachusetts.

== Description ==
The holotype specimen of Indotyphlops meszoelyi measures 17.9 centimetres (7.0 in) in total length (including tail), and has a diameter of 3 millimetres (0.12 in) in the middle of its body. It can be distinguished from other species in the same genus found in that region by the presence of a "deep concavity along the posterior border of the nasal shield". The snake is brown on its back and lighter brown on its belly, with the two colors merging into each other.

== Habitat and ecology ==
The holotype specimen of Indotyphlops meszoelyi was collected in a region of rugged hills, in the foothills of the Himalayas. It is thought to inhabit temperate broadleaf forests. The area in which the specimen was collected was historically montane forest, but today has been mostly turned into fruit orchards and paddy fields. Indotyphlops meszoelyi is oviparous, or egg-laying.

== Geographic range and conservation status ==
The holotype specimen of Indotyphlops meszoelyi was collected in Darjeeling district of the Indian state of West Bengal, at an altitude of 2,285 metres (7,497 ft) above sea level. No other information about its distribution is currently available. The International Union for Conservation of Nature (IUCN) classified Typhlops meszoelyi as Data Deficient in 2010, based on the fact that the species was only known from the location in which the holotype specimen was collected. However, it stated that habitat loss and degradation were known to occur within the range of the species, although the impact of these on the snake was unknown. The area in which the specimen was found is used to graze livestock, which may constitute a threat to the species.
