= Sri Lanka worm snake =

Conservation status
- Critically Endangered (IUCN 3.1)

Scientific classification
- Kingdom: Animalia
- Phylum: Chordata
- Class: Reptilia
- Order: Squamata
- Suborder: Serpentes
- Family: Typhlopidae
- Genus: Indotyphlops
- Species: I. lankaensis

Binomial name
- Indotyphlops lankaensis (Taylor, 1947)

Synonyms
- Typhlops lankaensis Taylor, 1947

Species of snake

The Sri Lanka worm snake (Indotyphlops lankaensis) is a species of snake in the Typhlopidae family. It is endemic to Sri Lanka.
