= Indotyphlops pammeces =

Conservation status
- Least Concern (IUCN 3.1)

Scientific classification
- Domain: Eukaryota
- Kingdom: Animalia
- Phylum: Chordata
- Class: Reptilia
- Order: Squamata
- Suborder: Serpentes
- Family: Typhlopidae
- Genus: Indotyphlops
- Species: I. pammeces

Binomial name
- Indotyphlops pammeces (Günther, 1864)

Synonyms
- Typhlops tenuis - Günther, 1864; Typhlops pammeces - Günther, 1864; Typhlops braminus var. pammeces - Boettger, 1898; Typhlops psammophilus - Annandale, 1906; Typhlops psammeces - M.A. Smith, 1943; Typhlops pammeces - Hahn, 1980

Species of snake

Indotyphlops pammeces, the South India worm snake, is a harmless blind snake species found in southern India. No subspecies are currently recognized.

== Geographic range ==
Found in southern India. The type locality given is "Madras" [India].
