= Cyrtopodion belaense =

Scientific classification
- Kingdom: Animalia
- Phylum: Chordata
- Class: Reptilia
- Order: Squamata
- Suborder: Gekkota
- Family: Gekkonidae
- Genus: Cyrtopodion
- Species: C. belaense

Binomial name
- Cyrtopodion belaense Nazarov, Ananjeva & Papenfuss, 2011

Species of lizard

Cyrtopodion belaense is a species of gecko, a lizard in the family Gekkonidae. The species is endemic to southern Pakistan.
