= Indotyphlops loveridgei =

Conservation status
- Data Deficient (IUCN 3.1)

Scientific classification
- Kingdom: Animalia
- Phylum: Chordata
- Class: Reptilia
- Order: Squamata
- Suborder: Serpentes
- Family: Typhlopidae
- Genus: Indotyphlops
- Species: I. loveridgei

Binomial name
- Indotyphlops loveridgei (Constable, 1949)

Synonyms
- Typhlops loveridgei Constable, 1949

Species of snake

Indotyphlops loveridgei, also known commonly as Loveridge's worm snake, is a species of harmless snake in the family Typhlopidae of the infraorder Scolecophidia (blind snakes). The species is native to northern India. There are no subspecies that are recognized as being valid.

== Etymology ==
The specific name, loveridgei, is in honor of British herpetologist Arthur Loveridge.

== Geographic range ==
Indotyphlops loveridgei is known only from the type specimen, the type locality for which is uncertain: "probably from North India", and likely from "Ambala or the Kulu Valley".

== Behavior ==
Indotyphlops loveridgei is terrestrial.

== Reproduction ==
Indotyphlops loveridgei is oviparous.
