= Cyrtopodion watsoni =

Scientific classification
- Kingdom: Animalia
- Phylum: Chordata
- Class: Reptilia
- Order: Squamata
- Suborder: Gekkota
- Family: Gekkonidae
- Genus: Cyrtopodion
- Species: C. watsoni

Binomial name
- Cyrtopodion watsoni (Murray, 1892)

Synonyms
- Gymnodactylus watsoni Murray, 1892; Gymnodactylus ingoldbyi Procter, 1923; Gymnodactylus kachhensis watsoni — M.A. Smith, 1935; Cyrtodactylus watsoni — Minton, 1966; Tenuidactylus watsoni — Szczerbak & Golubev, 1984; Cyrtopodion watsoni — Kluge, 1993

Species of lizard

Cyrtopodion watsoni, also known commonly as the northern spotted ground gecko, the Pakistani thin-toed gecko, and Watson's gecko, is a species of lizard in the family Gekkonidae. The species is native to South Asia.

== Etymology ==
The specific name, watsoni, is in honor of Lieutenant E.Y. Watson of the Indian army, who collected the holotype.

== Geographic range ==
C. watsoni is endemic to Pakistan.

== Reproduction ==
C. watsoni is oviparous.
