= Cyrtopodion golubevi =

Scientific classification
- Kingdom: Animalia
- Phylum: Chordata
- Class: Reptilia
- Order: Squamata
- Suborder: Gekkota
- Family: Gekkonidae
- Genus: Cyrtopodion
- Species: C. golubevi

Binomial name
- Cyrtopodion golubevi Nazarov, Ananjeva & Rajabizadeh, 2010

Species of lizard

Cyrtopodion golubevi is a species of gecko, a lizard in the family Gekkonidae. The species is endemic to southeastern Iran.

== Etymology ==
The specific name, golubevi, is in honor of Russian herpetologist Michael Leonidovich Golubev (1947–2005).

== Geographic range ==
C. golubevi is found in southeastern Iran in the province of Sistan and Baluchestan.

== Description ==
C. golubevi may attain a snout-to-vent length of about 6 cm (2.4 in), with a tail about 8 cm (3.1 in) long. The legs are very thin, and the tip of the tail is whitish.

== Reproduction ==
C. golubevi is oviparous.
