= Violet worm snake =

Conservation status
- Data Deficient (IUCN 3.1)

Scientific classification
- Kingdom: Animalia
- Phylum: Chordata
- Class: Reptilia
- Order: Squamata
- Suborder: Serpentes
- Family: Typhlopidae
- Genus: Indotyphlops
- Species: I. violaceus

Binomial name
- Indotyphlops violaceus (Taylor, 1947)

Synonyms
- Typhlops violaceus

Species of snake

The violet worm snake (Indotyphlops violaceus) is a species of snake in the Typhlopidae family.
