= Indotyphlops exiguus =

Conservation status
- Data Deficient (IUCN 3.1)

Scientific classification
- Kingdom: Animalia
- Phylum: Chordata
- Class: Reptilia
- Order: Squamata
- Suborder: Serpentes
- Family: Typhlopidae
- Genus: Indotyphlops
- Species: I. exiguus

Binomial name
- Indotyphlops exiguus (Jan, 1864)

Synonyms
- T[yphlops]. exiguus - Jan In Jan & Sordelli, 1864; Typhlops exiguus - Boulenger, 1893; Typhlops exignus - Werner, 1921

Species of snake

Indotyphlops exiguus, the Belgaum worm snake, is a species of blind snake found in India. No subspecies are currently recognized.

== Geographic range ==
Found in southwestern India where it is known only from Belgaum in the state of Karnataka. The type locality given is "Indes orientalis" [East Indies].
