= Pied worm snake =

Conservation status
- Critically Endangered (IUCN 3.1)

Scientific classification
- Kingdom: Animalia
- Phylum: Chordata
- Class: Reptilia
- Order: Squamata
- Suborder: Serpentes
- Family: Typhlopidae
- Genus: Indotyphlops
- Species: I. leucomelas

Binomial name
- Indotyphlops leucomelas (Boulenger, 1890)

Synonyms
- Typhlops leucomelas; Asiatyphlops leucomelas

Species of snake

The pied worm snake (Indotyphlops leucomelas) is a species of snake in the Typhlopidae family.
