= Indotyphlops fletcheri =

Scientific classification
- Kingdom: Animalia
- Phylum: Chordata
- Class: Reptilia
- Order: Squamata
- Suborder: Serpentes
- Family: Typhlopidae
- Genus: Indotyphlops
- Species: I. fletcheri

Binomial name
- Indotyphlops fletcheri (Wall, 1919)

Synonyms
- Typhlops fletcheri

Species of snake

Indotyphlops fletcheri is a species of worm snake. It is endemic to India.
