= Rosy-tailed sandstone gecko =

Scientific classification
- Kingdom: Animalia
- Phylum: Chordata
- Class: Reptilia
- Order: Squamata
- Suborder: Gekkota
- Family: Gekkonidae
- Genus: Cyrtopodion
- Species: C. rhodocauda

Binomial name
- Cyrtopodion rhodocauda (Baig, 1998)

Synonyms
- Tenuidactylus rhodocaudus; Indogekko rhodocaudus; Cyrtopodion rhodocaudum; Cyrtopodion rhodocaudus

Species of lizard

The rosy-tailed sandstone gecko (Cyrtopodion rhodocauda) is a species of gecko, a lizard in the family Gekkonidae. The species is endemic to Balochistan, Pakistan.
