= Barred gecko =

Conservation status
- Data Deficient (IUCN 3.1)

Scientific classification
- Kingdom: Animalia
- Phylum: Chordata
- Class: Reptilia
- Order: Squamata
- Suborder: Gekkota
- Family: Gekkonidae
- Genus: Cyrtodactylus
- Species: C. martinstolli

Binomial name
- Cyrtodactylus martinstolli (Darevsky, Helfenberger, Orlov & Shah, 1998)

Synonyms
- Gonydactylus martinstolli Darevsky, Helfenberger, Orlov & Shah, 1998; Cyrtopodion martinstolli — Rösler, 2000; Siwaligekko martinstolli — Khan, 2003; Cyrtodactylus martinstolli — Mahony et al., 2009

Species of lizard

The barred gecko (Cyrtodactylus martinstolli), also known commonly as the Ilam bent-toed gecko, is a species of lizard in the family Gekkonidae. The species is endemic to Nepal.

== Etymology ==
The specific name, martinstolli, is in honor of Swiss photographer Martin Stoll (born 1956).

== Description ==
Medium-sized for its genus, Cyrtodactylus martinstolli may attain a snout-to-vent length (SVL) of 8 cm (3.1 in). Dorsally, there are 8–11 dark crossbands on the body, and alternating dark and light crossbands on the tail.

== Habitat ==
The preferred natural habitat of Cyrtodactylus martinstolli is unknown. The species is known from only a few specimens, all of which were collected from roadside clay and stone walls, at altitudes of 1,200–1,300 m (3,900–4,300 ft).

== Reproduction ==
Cyrtodactylus martinstolli is oviparous.
