= Darmandville bow-fingered gecko =

Conservation status
- Least Concern (IUCN 3.1)

Scientific classification
- Kingdom: Animalia
- Phylum: Chordata
- Class: Reptilia
- Order: Squamata
- Suborder: Gekkota
- Family: Gekkonidae
- Genus: Cyrtodactylus
- Species: C. darmandvillei

Binomial name
- Cyrtodactylus darmandvillei (Weber, 1890)

Synonyms
- Gymnodactylus d'armandvillei Weber, 1890; Gymnodactylus defossei Dunn, 1927; Cyrtodactylus d'armandvillei — Underwood, 1954; Gymnodactylus darmandvillei — Wermuth, 1965; Cyrtodactylus darmandvillei — Rösler, 2000

Species of lizard

The Darmandville bow-fingered gecko (Cyrtodactylus darmandvillei) is a species of lizard in the family Gekkonidae. The species is endemic to Indonesia.

== Etymology ==
The specific name, darmandvillei, is in honor of Jesuit Missionary Father Cornelis J. F. le Coq d'Armandville (1846–1896).

== Geographic range ==
C. darmandvillei is found on the Indonesian islands of Flores, Komodo, Lombok, Pulau Kalao, and Sumbawa.

== Habitat ==
The preferred natural habitats of C. darmandvillei are forest and freshwater wetlands, at altitudes from sea level to 650 m (2,130 ft).

== Description ==
The holotype of C. darmandvillei has a snout-to-vent length (SVL) of 8.5 cm (3.3 in) and a tail length of 10 cm (3.9 in).

== Behavior ==
C. darmandvillei is both terrestrial and arboreal.

== Reproduction ==
C. darmandvillei is oviparous.
