= Indotyphlops tenebrarum =

Conservation status
- Data Deficient (IUCN 3.1)

Scientific classification
- Kingdom: Animalia
- Phylum: Chordata
- Class: Reptilia
- Order: Squamata
- Suborder: Serpentes
- Family: Typhlopidae
- Genus: Indotyphlops
- Species: I. tenebrarum

Binomial name
- Indotyphlops tenebrarum (Taylor, 1947)

Synonyms
- Typhlops tenebrarum

Species of snake

Indotyphlops tenebrarum is a species of snake in the Typhlopidae family.
