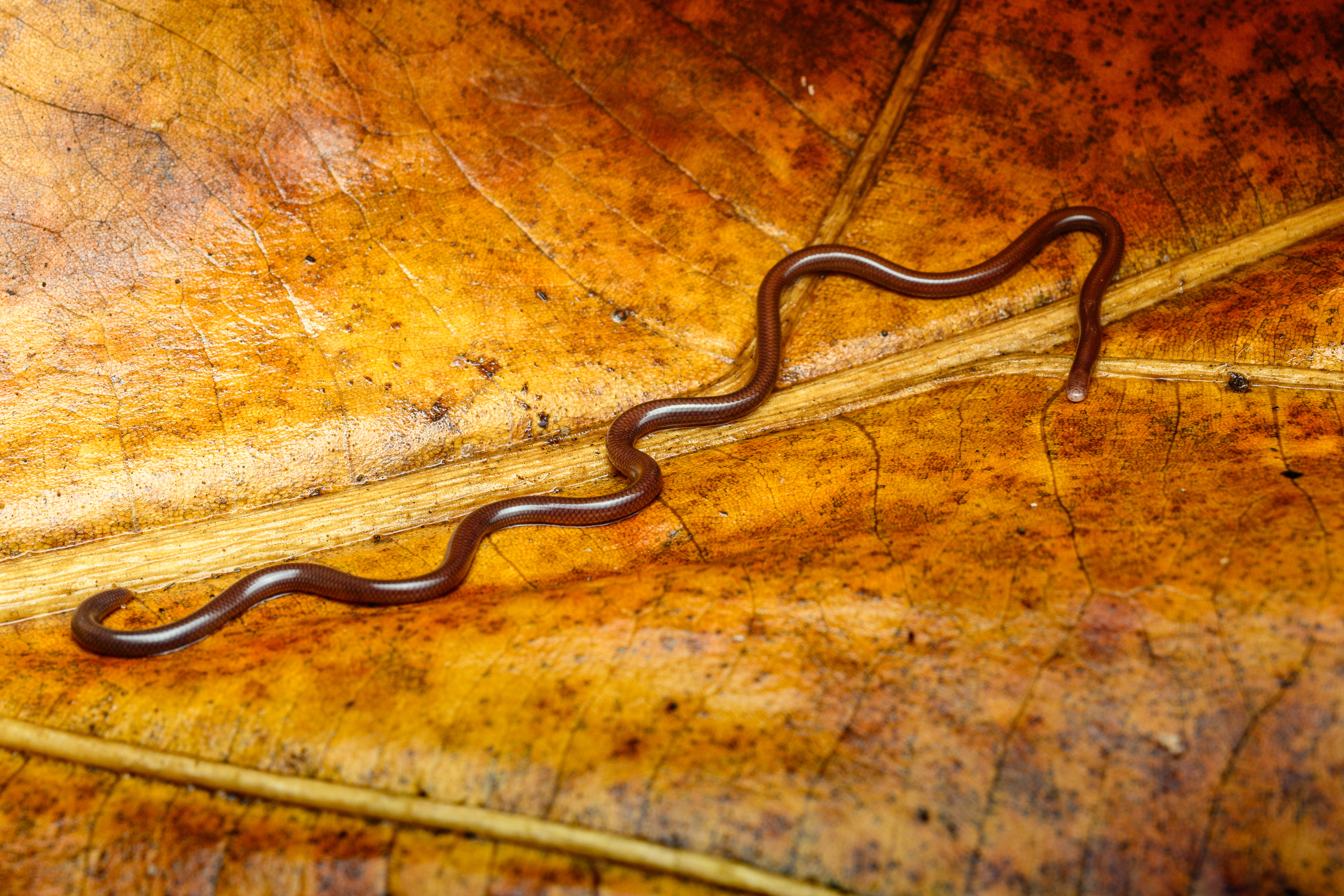
- Slender worm snake, Indotyphlops porrectus

Conservation status
- Least Concern (IUCN 3.1)

Scientific classification
- Kingdom: Animalia
- Phylum: Chordata
- Class: Reptilia
- Order: Squamata
- Suborder: Serpentes
- Family: Typhlopidae
- Genus: Indotyphlops
- Species: I. porrectus

Binomial name
- Indotyphlops porrectus (Stoliczka, 1871)

Synonyms
- Typhlops porrectus Stoliczka, 1871; Typhlops porrectus — Boulenger, 1893; Typhlops mackinnoni Wall, 1910; Typhlops venningi Wall, 1913; Typhlops porrecta — Constable, 1949; Typhlops porrectus — Hahn, 1980; Indotyphlops porrectus — Hedges et al., 2014

= Indotyphlops porrectus =

Species of snake

Indotyphlops porrectus, the slender worm snake, is a species of harmless blind snake in the family Typhlopidae. The species is endemic to South Asia. There are no subspecies that are recognized as being valid. There is no further study available about this species because their number is almost non-existent and their picture has not been recorded yet۔

== Geographic range ==
Indotyphlops porrectus is found in Bangladesh, India, northern Myanmar, Pakistan, and Sri Lanka.

The type locality given is "Hurdwár, ... Calcutta, ... foot of the Parisnáth Hill (in western Bengal), ... base of the Rangnu Valley below Darjíling, ... and south of Agra" [northern and eastern India].

== Description ==
Indotyphlops porrectus is small and slender. It may attain a total length (including tail) of 28.5 cm (11.2 in), and a diameter of about 0.5 cm (0.20 in). There are 18 scale rows around the body. It is brown or blackish dorsally, and paler ventrally. The snout, chin, and anal region are whitish.

== Reproduction ==
Indotyphlops porrectus is oviparous.
