= Jammu bent-toed gecko =

Conservation status
- Data Deficient (IUCN 3.1)

Scientific classification
- Kingdom: Animalia
- Phylum: Chordata
- Class: Reptilia
- Order: Squamata
- Suborder: Gekkota
- Family: Gekkonidae
- Genus: Cyrtopodion
- Species: C. mansarulum

Binomial name
- Cyrtopodion mansarulum Duda & Sahi, 1978

Synonyms
- Cyrtodactylus mansarulus Duda & Sahi, 1978; Cyrtopodion mansarulum — Agarwal et al., 2014

Species of lizard

The Jammu bent-toed gecko (Cyrtopodion mansarulum) is a species of gecko, a lizard in the family Gekkonidae. The species is endemic to northern India.

== Geographic range ==
C. mansarulum is found in the Indian state of Jammu and Kashmir. It may also occur in adjacent northern Pakistan.

== Reproduction ==
C. mansarulum is oviparous.
