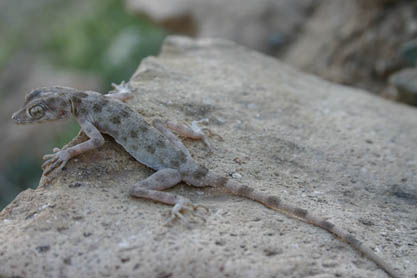

Scientific classification
- Kingdom: Animalia
- Phylum: Chordata
- Class: Reptilia
- Order: Squamata
- Suborder: Gekkota
- Family: Gekkonidae
- Genus: Cyrtopodion
- Species: C. persepolense

Binomial name
- Cyrtopodion persepolense Nazarov, Ananjeva & Rajabizadeh, 2010

= Persepolis angular-toed gecko =

Species of lizard

The Persepolis angular-toed gecko (Cyrtopodion persepolense) is a species of gecko, a lizard in the family Gekkonidae. The species is endemic to Iran.

== Geographic range ==
C. persepolense is found in Fars province in southwestern Iran.
