= Cyrtopodion gastrophole =

Conservation status
- Data Deficient (IUCN 3.1)

Scientific classification
- Kingdom: Animalia
- Phylum: Chordata
- Class: Reptilia
- Order: Squamata
- Suborder: Gekkota
- Family: Gekkonidae
- Genus: Cyrtopodion
- Species: C. gastrophole

Binomial name
- Cyrtopodion gastrophole (F. Werner, 1917)
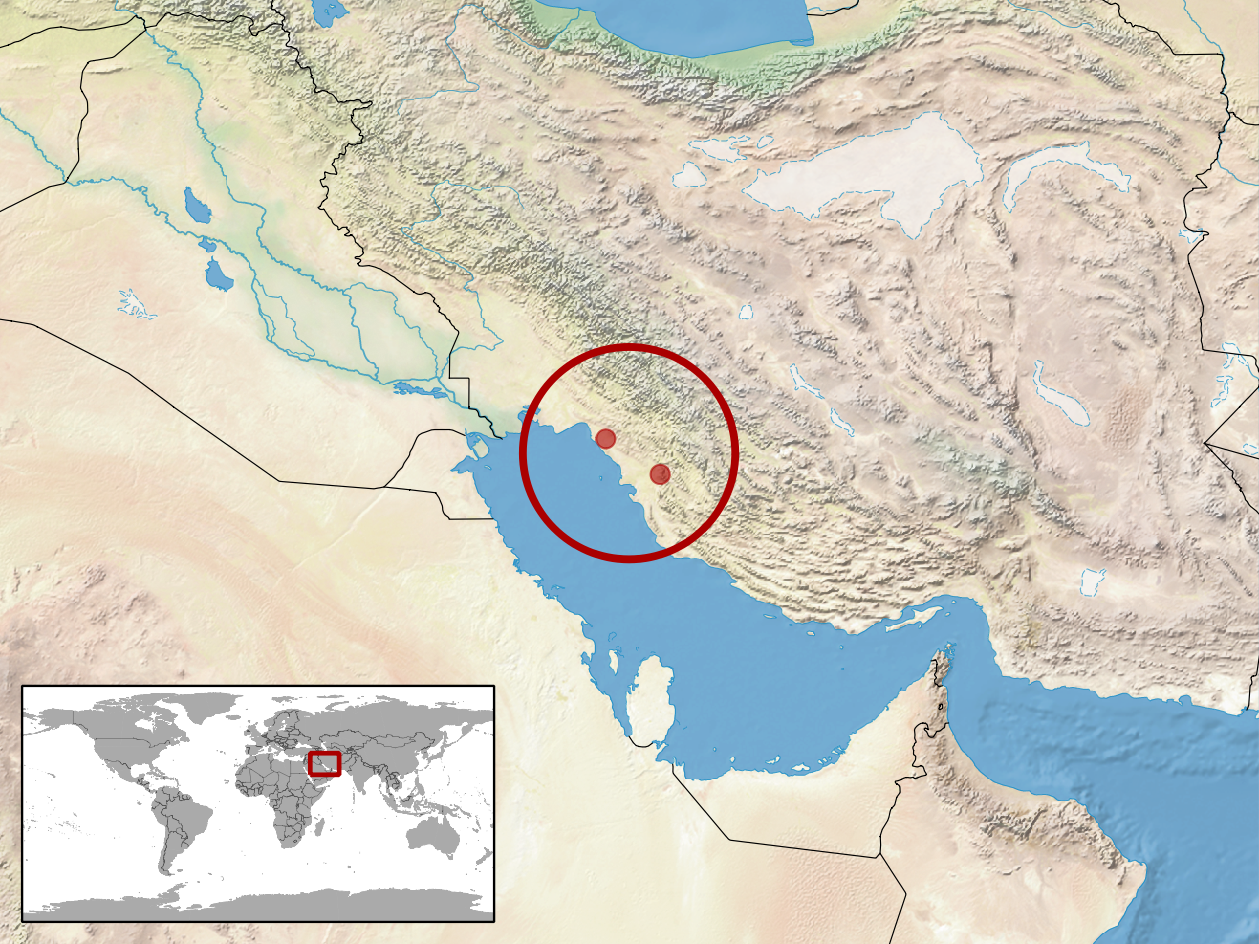

Synonyms
- Gymnodactylus gastropholis F. Werner, 1917; Agamura gastropholis — Minton, 1966; Cyrtodactylus gastropholis — S. Anderson, 1968; Cyrtopodion gastropholis — Leviton et al., 1992; Cyrtopodion gastrophole — S. Anderson, 1999

Species of lizard

Cyrtopodion gastrophole, also known commonly as the Farsian spider gecko, Werner's spider gecko, or Werner's bent-toed gecko, is a species of gecko, a lizard in the family Gekkonidae. The species is endemic to southcentral Iran.
