= Roesler's bent-toed gecko =

Conservation status
- Least Concern (IUCN 3.1)

Scientific classification
- Kingdom: Animalia
- Phylum: Chordata
- Class: Reptilia
- Order: Squamata
- Suborder: Gekkota
- Family: Gekkonidae
- Genus: Cyrtodactylus
- Species: C. roesleri

Binomial name
- Cyrtodactylus roesleri Ziegler, Nazarov, Orlov, Nguyen, Vu, Dang, Dinh & Schmitz, 2010

Species of lizard

Roesler's bent-toed gecko (Cyrtodactylus roesleri) is a species of lizard in the family Gekkonidae. The species is endemic to Southeast Asia.

== Etymology ==
The specific name, roesleri, is in honor of German herpetologist Herbert Rösler (born 1952).

== Geographic range ==
C. roesleri is found in Laos and Vietnam (Quang Binh Province).

== Habitat ==
The preferred habitats of C. roesleri are forest and rocky areas.

== Description ==
C. roesleri may attain a snout-to-vent length (SVL) of 7.5 cm (3.0 in).

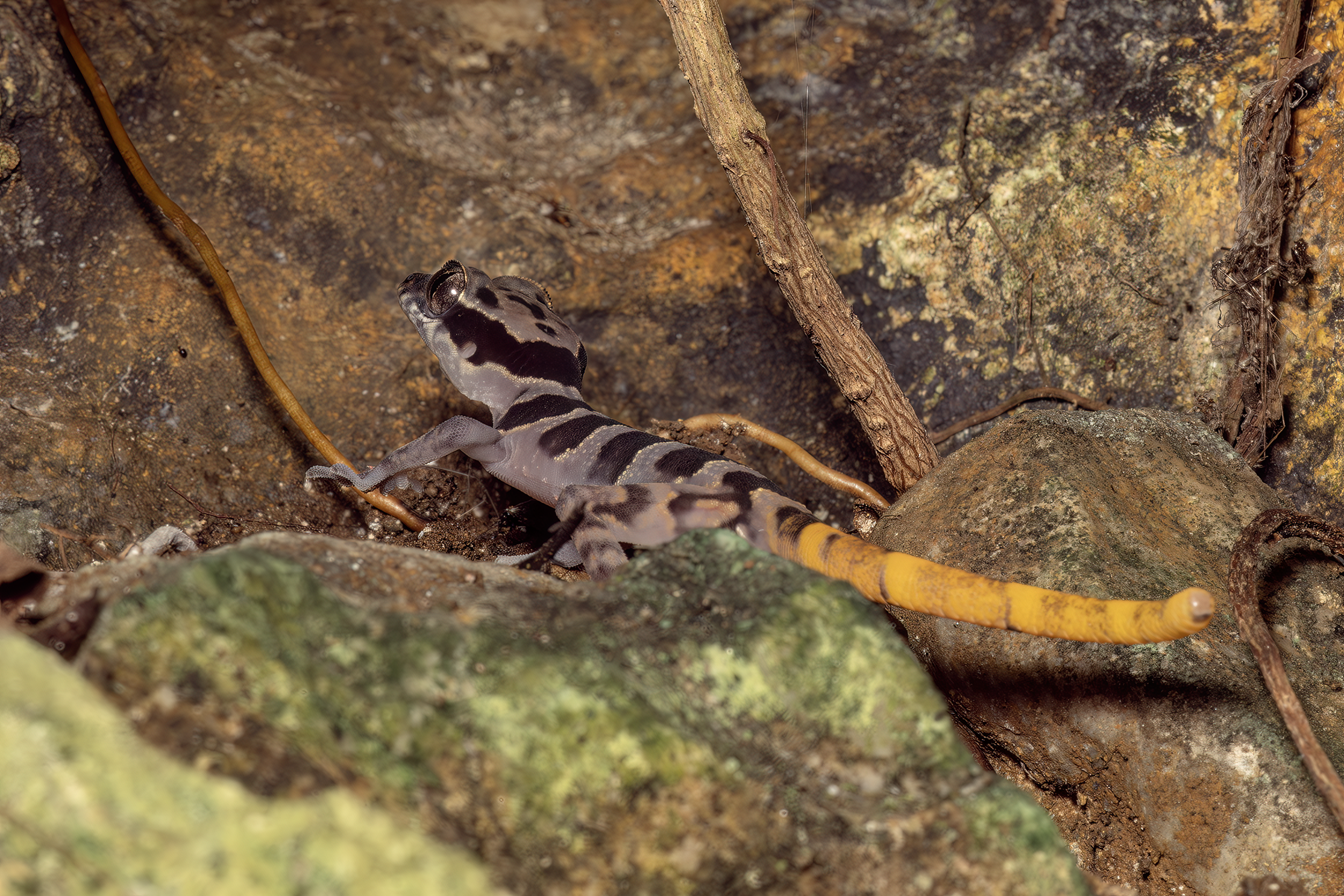
Roesler's bent-toed gecko

== Reproduction ==
The mode of reproduction of C. roesleri is unknown.
