= Malcolm's worm snake =

Conservation status
- Endangered (IUCN 3.1)

Scientific classification
- Kingdom: Animalia
- Phylum: Chordata
- Class: Reptilia
- Order: Squamata
- Suborder: Serpentes
- Family: Typhlopidae
- Genus: Indotyphlops
- Species: I. malcolmi

Binomial name
- Indotyphlops malcolmi (Taylor, 1947)

Synonyms
- Typhlops malcolmi Taylor, 1947; Indotyphlops malcolmi — Hedges et al., 2014

Species of snake

Malcolm's worm snake (Indotyphlops malcolmi) is a species of snake in the family Typhlopidae. The species is endemic to Sri Lanka.

== Etymology ==
The specific name, malcolmi, is in honor of British herpetologist Malcolm Arthur Smith.

== Description ==
Indotyphlops malcolmi is bicolored: it is brown dorsally, and cream-colored ventrally. It has 20 scales around the body, and the scales in the vertebral row number 261–273.

== Geographic range ==
Indotyphlops malcolmi is endemic to Sri Lanka.

== Habitat ==
The preferred natural habitat of Indotyphlops malcolmi is forest, at elevations from sea level to 10 m (33 ft), but it is also found in sand dunes and disturbed areas such as gardens, plantations, and other forms of agriculture.

== Behavior ==
Indotyphlops malcolmi is terrestrial and fossorial.

== Reproduction ==
Indotyphlops malcolmi is oviparous.
