= Kiabii's angular-toed gecko =

Scientific classification
- Kingdom: Animalia
- Phylum: Chordata
- Class: Reptilia
- Order: Squamata
- Suborder: Gekkota
- Family: Gekkonidae
- Genus: Cyrtopodion
- Species: C. kiabii

Binomial name
- Cyrtopodion kiabii Ahmadzadeh, Flecks, Torki & W. Böhme, 2011

Species of lizard

Kiabi's angular-toed gecko (Cyrtopodion kiabii) is a species of gecko, a lizard in the family Gekkonidae. The species is endemic to southern Iran.

== Etymology ==
The specific name, kiabii, is in honor of Iranian ecologist Bahram Hassanzadeh Kiabi of Shahid Beheshti University.

== Geographic range ==
C. kiabii is found in Bushehr Province, Iran.
