= Sistan angular-toed gecko =

Conservation status
- Least Concern (IUCN 3.1)

Scientific classification
- Kingdom: Animalia
- Phylum: Chordata
- Class: Reptilia
- Order: Squamata
- Suborder: Gekkota
- Family: Gekkonidae
- Genus: Cyrtopodion
- Species: C. sistanense

Binomial name
- Cyrtopodion sistanense Nazarov & Rajabizadeh, 2007

Synonyms
- Cyrtopodion turcmenicum — S. Anderson, 1999; Cyrtopodion sistanensis Nazarov & Rajabizadeh, 2007; Cyrtopodion sistanense — Bauer et al., 2013

Species of lizard

The Sistan angular-toed gecko (Cyrtopodion sistanense) is a species of gecko, a lizard in the family Gekkonidae. The species is endemic to Iran.

== Geographic range ==
C. sistanense is found in Sistan and Baluchestan province in southeastern Iran.

== Reproduction ==
C. sistanense is oviparous.
