= Cyrtopodion vindhya =

Scientific classification
- Kingdom: Animalia
- Phylum: Chordata
- Class: Reptilia
- Order: Squamata
- Suborder: Gekkota
- Family: Gekkonidae
- Genus: Cyrtopodion
- Species: C. vindhya

Binomial name
- Cyrtopodion vindhya Patel, Thackeray, Mirza, & Vyas, 2023

Species of lizard

Cyrtopodion vindhya is a species of gecko, a lizard in the family Gekkonidae. The species is endemic to India.
