= Schmutz's worm snake =

Conservation status
- Least Concern (IUCN 3.1)

Scientific classification
- Kingdom: Animalia
- Phylum: Chordata
- Class: Reptilia
- Order: Squamata
- Suborder: Serpentes
- Family: Typhlopidae
- Genus: Indotyphlops
- Species: I. schmutzi

Binomial name
- Indotyphlops schmutzi (Auffenberg, 1980)

Synonyms
- Typhlops schmutzi Auffenberg, 1980; Indotyphlops schmutzi — Hedges et al., 2014

Species of snake

Schmutz's worm snake (Indotyphlops schmutzi) is a species of snake in the family Typhlopidae. The species is endemic to Indonesia.

== Etymology ==
The specific name, schmutzi, is in honor of Father Erwin Schmutz, who in addition to being a missionary, is also a herpetologist and ornithologist.

== Geographic range ==
I. schmutzi is found in Indonesia on the islands of Flores and Komodo.

== Habitat ==
The preferred natural habitat of I. schmutzi is forest.

== Reproduction ==
I. schmutzi is oviparous.
