= Vedda worm snake =

Conservation status
- Data Deficient (IUCN 3.1)

Scientific classification
- Kingdom: Animalia
- Phylum: Chordata
- Class: Reptilia
- Order: Squamata
- Suborder: Serpentes
- Family: Typhlopidae
- Genus: Indotyphlops
- Species: I. veddae

Binomial name
- Indotyphlops veddae (Taylor, 1947)

Synonyms
- Typhlops veddae Taylor, 1947; Indotyphlops veddae — Hedges et al., 2014

Species of snake

The Vedda worm snake (Indotyphlops veddae), also known commonly as Veddha's blind snake, is a species of snake in the family Typhlopidae. The species is endemic to Sri Lanka.

== Etymology ==
The specific name, veddae, is in honor of the Vedda people, aboriginal inhabitants of Sri Lanka.

== Geographic range ==
The type locality of I. veddae is near Trincomalee, Sri Lanka.

== Habitat ==
The preferred natural habitat of I. veddae is forest.

== Description ==
I. veddae is uniformly lavender-gray, small, and very slender. The holotype has a total length of 90.5 mm (3.56 in), including the tail which is 2.75 mm (0.108 in) long. The average body width is 1.5 mm (0.059 in).

== Reproduction ==
I. veddae is oviparous.
