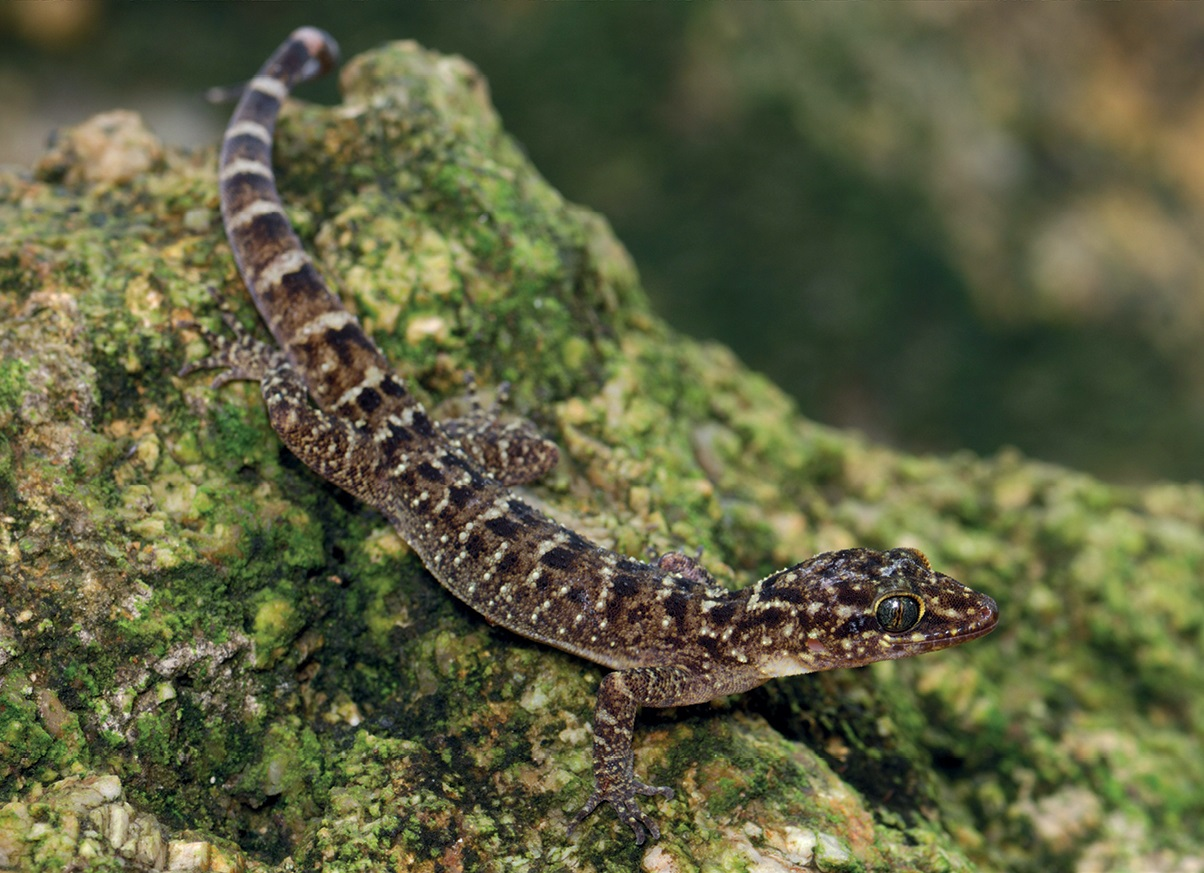

Scientific classification
- Kingdom: Animalia
- Phylum: Chordata
- Class: Reptilia
- Order: Squamata
- Suborder: Gekkota
- Family: Gekkonidae
- Genus: Cyrtodactylus
- Species: C. batucolus

Binomial name
- Cyrtodactylus batucolus Grismer, Chan, Grismer, Wood & Belabut, 2008

= Besar Island bent-toed gecko =

Species of lizard

The Besar Island bent-toed gecko (Cyrtodactylus batucolus) is a species of gecko endemic to Besar Island in Malaysia.
