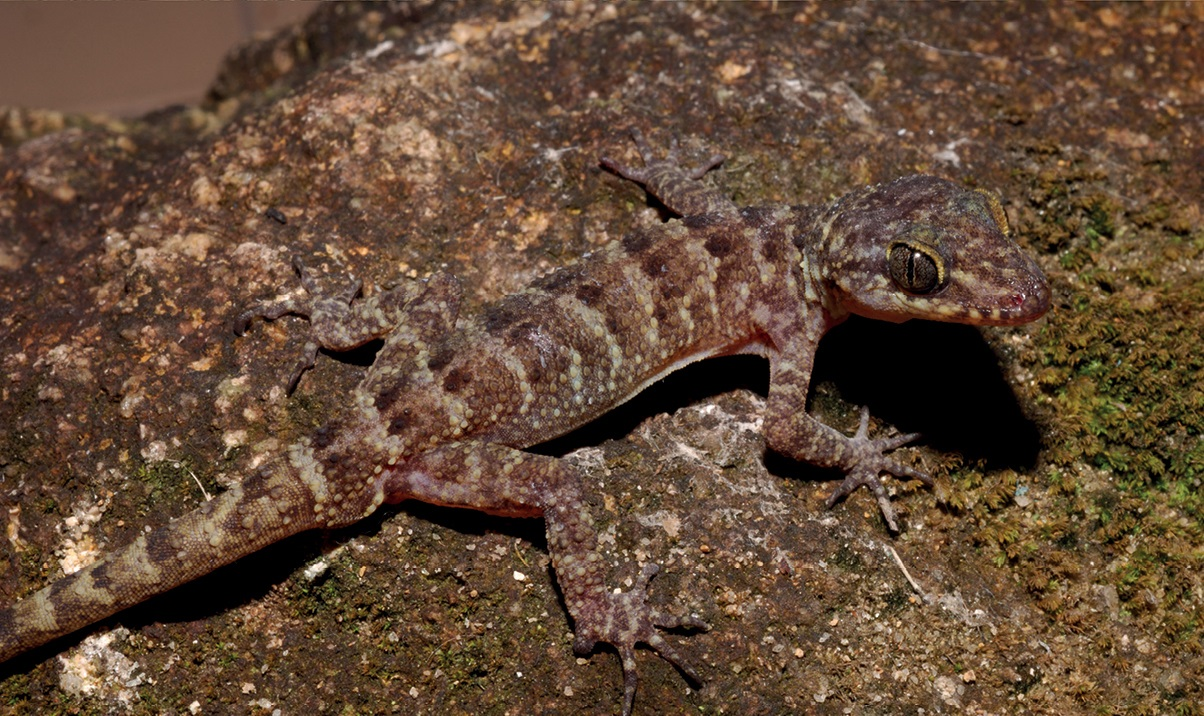

Scientific classification
- Kingdom: Animalia
- Phylum: Chordata
- Class: Reptilia
- Order: Squamata
- Suborder: Gekkota
- Family: Gekkonidae
- Genus: Cyrtodactylus
- Species: C. seribuatensis

Binomial name
- Cyrtodactylus seribuatensis Youmans & Grismer, 2006

= Seribuat bent-toed gecko =

Species of lizard

The Seribuat bent-toed gecko (Cyrtodactylus seribuatensis) is a species of gecko that is endemic to western Malaysia.
