= Cyrtodactylus jatnai =

Scientific classification
- Kingdom: Animalia
- Phylum: Chordata
- Class: Reptilia
- Order: Squamata
- Suborder: Gekkota
- Family: Gekkonidae
- Genus: Cyrtodactylus
- Species: C. jatnai

Binomial name
- Cyrtodactylus jatnai Amarasinghe, Riyanto, Mumpuni & Grismer, 2020

Species of lizard

Cyrtodactylus jatnai, Jatna's bent-toed gecko, is a species of lizard in the family Gekkonidae. The species is endemic to Indonesia.

== Etymology ==
The specific name, jatnai is in honor of Indonesian conservationist Jatna Supriatna.

== Geographic range ==
C. jatnai is found in western Bali, Indonesia.

== Description ==
C. jatnai may attain a snout-to-vent length (SVL) of about 6.5 cm (2.6 in).

== Reproduction ==
The mode of reproduction of C. jatnai is unknown.
