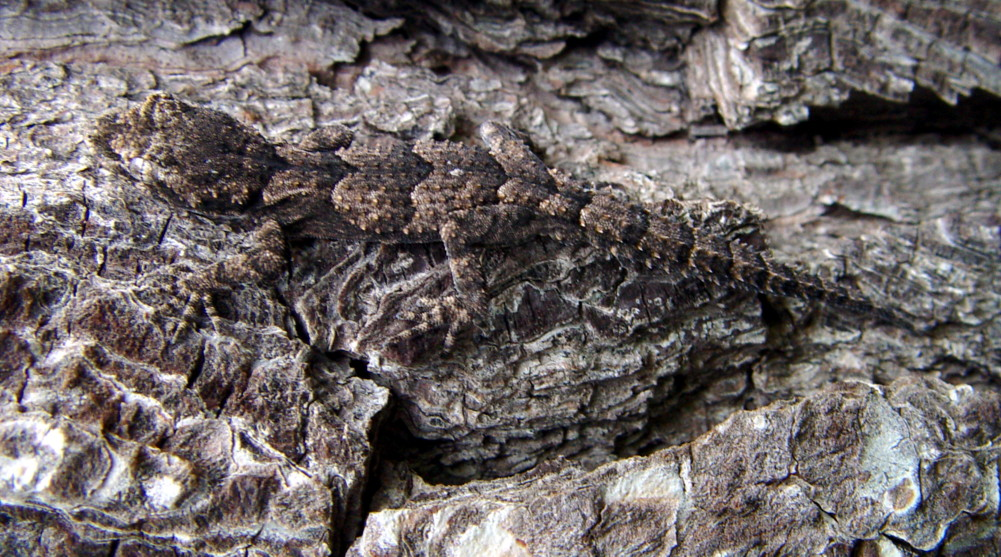
- Mediodactylus kotschyi

Scientific classification
- Kingdom: Animalia
- Phylum: Chordata
- Class: Reptilia
- Order: Squamata
- Suborder: Gekkota
- Family: Gekkonidae
- Subfamily: Gekkoninae
- Genus: Cyrtopodion; Fitzinger, 1843

Species
- 25 recognized species, see article.

= Cyrtopodion =

Genus of lizards

Cyrtopodion is a genus of lizards in the family Gekkonidae (geckos), with 25 described species.

== Species ==
Species in the genus Cyrtopodion are:

- Cyrtopodion agamuroides (Nikolsky, 1900)
- Cyrtopodion aravallensis (Gill, 1997) – Delhi rock gecko
- Cyrtopodion baigii Masroor, 2008
- Cyrtopodion belaense Nazarov, Ananjeva & Papenfuss, 2011
- Cyrtopodion brevipes (Blanford, 1874)
- Cyrtopodion fortmunroi (Khan, 1993)
- Cyrtopodion gastrophole (F. Werner, 1917) – Werner's bent-toed gecko
- Cyrtopodion golubevi Nazarov, Ananjeva & Rajabizadeh, 2010
- Cyrtopodion hormozganum Nazarov, Bondarenko & Rajabizadeh, 2010
- Cyrtopodion indusoani (Khan, 1988)
- Cyrtopodion kachhense (Stoliczka, 1872)
- Cyrtopodion kiabii Ahmadzadeh et al., 2011
- Cyrtopodion kirmanense (Nikolsky, 1900)
- Cyrtopodion kohsulaimanai (Khan, 1991)
- Cyrtopodion mansarulum (Duda & Sahi, 1978) – Jammu bent-toed gecko
- Cyrtopodion medogense (Zhao & Li, 1987)
- Cyrtopodion montiumsalsorum (Annandale, 1913)
- Cyrtopodion persepolense Nazarov, Ananjeva & Rajabizadeh, 2010
- Cyrtopodion potoharense Khan, 2001
- Cyrtopodion rhodocaudum (Baig, 1998)
- Cyrtopodion rohtasfortai (Khan & Tasnim, 1990)
- Cyrtopodion scabrum (Heyden, 1827)
- Cyrtopodion sistanense Nazarov & Rajabizadeh, 2007
- Cyrtopodion vindhya Patel, Thackeray, Mirza & Vyas, 2023
- Cyrtopodion watsoni (Murray, 1892)

Nota bene: A binomial authority in parentheses indicates that the species was originally described in a different genus.
