= Farmer's bent-toed gecko =

Conservation status
- Data Deficient (IUCN 3.1)

Scientific classification
- Kingdom: Animalia
- Phylum: Chordata
- Class: Reptilia
- Order: Squamata
- Suborder: Gekkota
- Family: Gekkonidae
- Genus: Cyrtodactylus
- Species: C. petani

Binomial name
- Cyrtodactylus petani Riyanto, L. Grismer & Wood, 2015

Species of lizard

The farmer's bent-toed gecko (Cyrtodactylus petani) is a species of lizard in the family Gekkonidae. The species is endemic to Java.

== Etymology ==
C. petani was discovered in 2006 on a farm, hence its common name. The specific name, petani, means "farmer" in the Indonesian language.

== Geographic range ==
C. petani is found in eastern Java, in the province of East Java.

== Description ==
Small for its genus, C. petani may attain a snout-to-vent length (SVL) of 5.7 cm (2.2 in).

== Reproduction ==
The mode of reproduction of C. petani is unknown.
