= Muhammad Sharif Khan =

Muhammad Sharif Khan (1939–2023) was a Pakistani zoologist and herpetologist.

== Life ==
Khan was born in 1939. He attended the University of the Punjab, where he completed his undergraduate degree in 1960 and an MSc in 1963. He later taught zoology at Talimul-Islam College in Rabwah and earned a doctorate in 1996.

== Books ==
- A Guide to the Snakes of Pakistan (2002)
- Amphibians and Reptiles of Pakistan (2006)
