= Herbert Rösler (herpetologist) =

German herpetologist (born 1952)

- Born: 1952 (age 73–74); Thale, Germany
- Known for: Gecko morphology and taxonomy, description of new species
- Scientific career
- Fields: Zoology, Herpetology
- Institutions: Staatliche Naturhistorische Sammlungen Dresden, Museum für Tierkunde, Dresden, Naturkundemuseum Erfurt

Herbert Rösler (born 1952 in Thale) is a German zoologist and herpetologist. His research focuses primarily on geckos, particularly their morphology and taxonomy. He is the author of numerous books and scientific articles on the subject and has described many new species.

== Biography ==
Rösler began his career outside academia, working as a stove setter, toolmaker and mechatronics technician. He developed an interest in geckos as a teenager and started a personal specimen collection, which over 45 years grew into a scientific collection of over 1,000 specimens. He has discovered 24 gecko species new to science.

He has been affiliated with the Staatliche Naturhistorische Sammlungen Dresden and Museum für Tierkunde, Dresden and has participated in public education programs at the Naturkundemuseum Erfurt.

== Eponymous species ==
Two gecko species have been named in his honor:

- Cyrtodactylus roesleri
- Phelsuma roesleri
