= Sekhar =

Sekhar may refer to:

- Sekhar Basu (1952–2020), Indian nuclear scientist
- Sekhar Chandra, Indian cricketer
- Sekhar Das (born 1952), Bengali Movie director, scriptwriter
- Ashok Sekhar Ganguly (born 1935), CBE, former chairman of Hindustan Lever, nominated member of the Rajya Sabha
- Sekhar V. Joseph, cinematographer in Kollywood, the Tamil film based industry in South India
- Sekhar Kammula (born 1972), Indian film director, screenwriter and producer
- Sekhar Menon (born 1983), Indian actor primarily working in Malayalam cinema and a disc jockey
- Sayan Sekhar Mondal (born 1989), Indian cricketer
- Sukhendu Sekhar Roy (born 1949), Indian politician belonging to the Trinamool Congress
- Chandra Sekhar Sahu (born 1950), member of the 14th Lok Sabha of India
- Chandra Sekhar Sankurathri, founder of the Sankurathri Foundation
- A Saye Sekhar, Indian journalist, columnist, and a political analyst
- Devineni Raja Sekhar, represents Kankipadu Assembly Constituency in Krishna District, Andhra Pradesh
- G. C. Sekhar, Telugu and Tamil film director
- Guna Sekhar (born 1964), Indian film director and screenwriter
- Krishna Sekhar (born 1978), Indian film actor
- Master Sekhar (1963–2003), Indian film actor in Tamil film industry
- Samanta Chandra Sekhar (1835–1904), Indian astrologer and scholar
- Raja Ravi Sekhar (born 1954), Indian chess master
- T. A. Sekhar (born 1956), cricketer and medium pace bowler who represented India
- V. Sekhar, Indian film director who has directed Tamil films
- Vinod Sekhar (born 1968), the President and Group Chief Executive of Petra Group, a Malaysian company
- Sekhar Suri, Indian film director predominately works for Telugu films
- Sekhar Tam Tam MBE, medical doctor, serves on the Grenada Pharmacy Council
- Chandra Sekhar Yeleti (born 1973), Indian film director

== See also ==
- Silda Chandra Sekhar College, undergraduate coeducational college in Silda, Paschim Medinipur, West Bengal, India
- Sekhar v. United States, United States Supreme Court decision regarding extortion under the Hobbs Act of 1946
- Sehar
- Seka (disambiguation)
- Sekar
- Sekha
- Shekhar (disambiguation)
