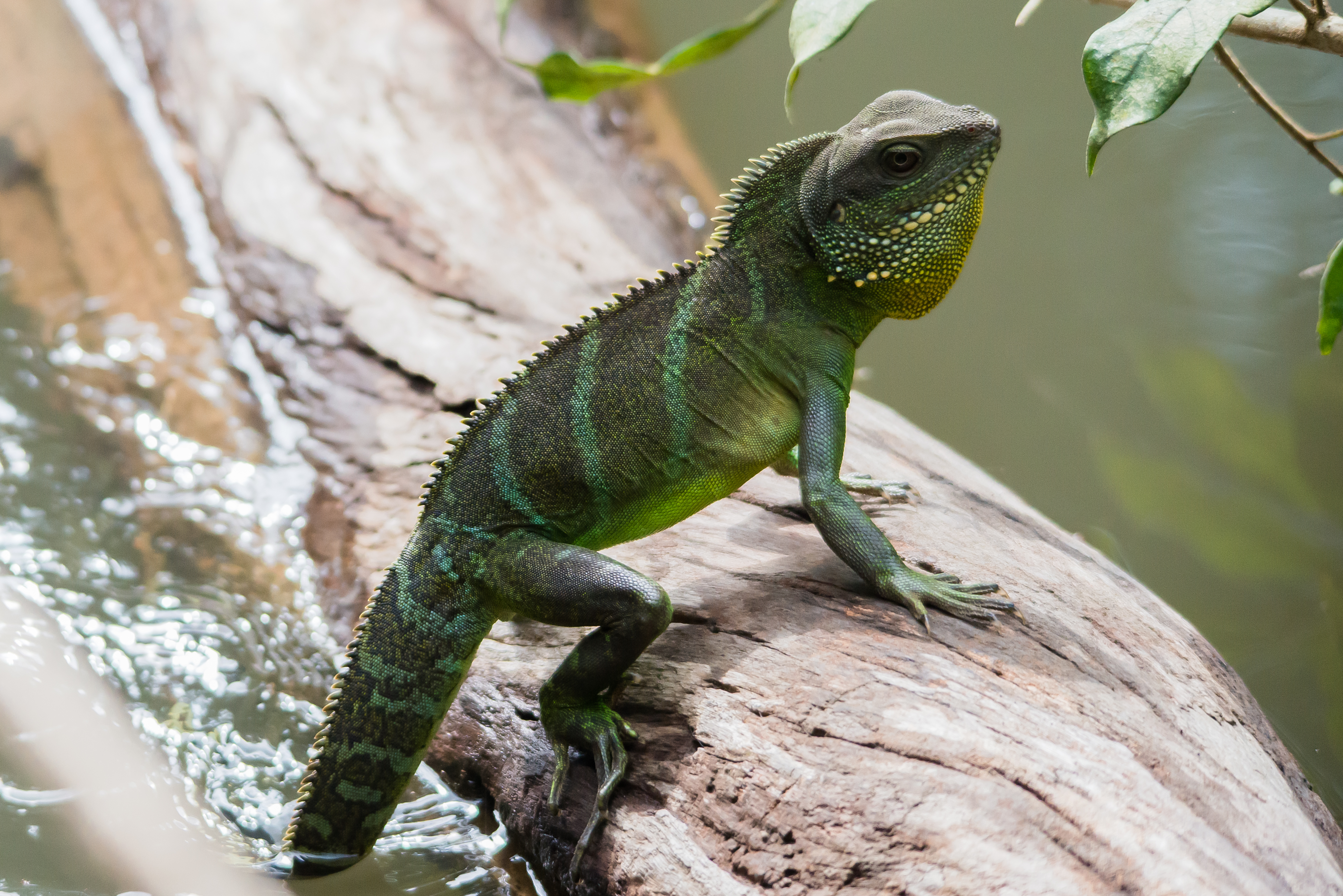
- At Khao Yai National Park in Thailand

Conservation status
- Vulnerable (IUCN 3.1)
- CITES Appendix II

Scientific classification
- Kingdom: Animalia
- Phylum: Chordata
- Class: Reptilia
- Order: Squamata
- Suborder: Iguania
- Family: Agamidae
- Genus: Physignathus; Cuvier, 1829
- Species: P. cocincinus

Binomial name
- Physignathus cocincinus Cuvier, 1829
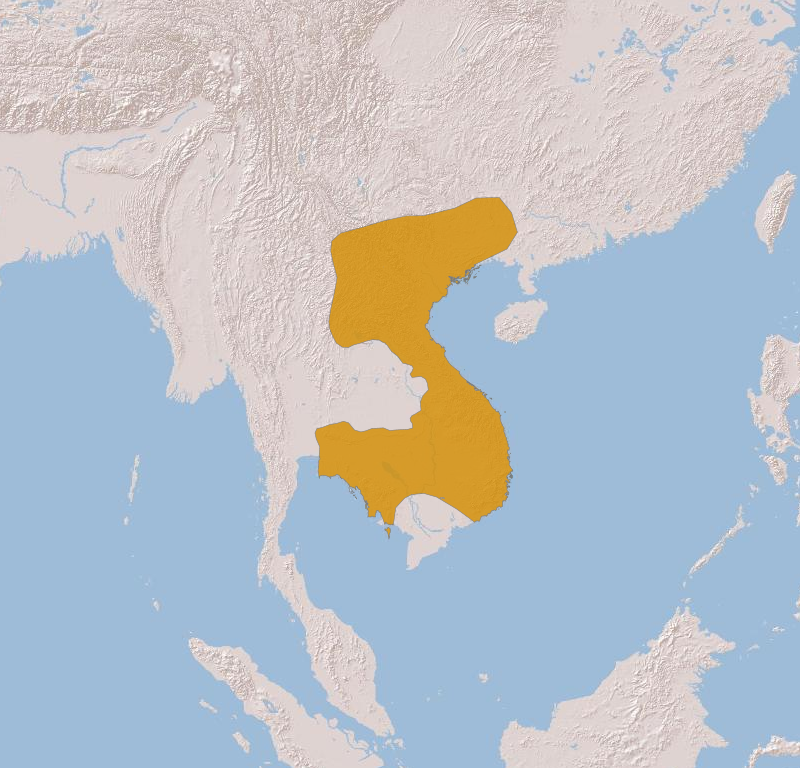
- Native range of Physignathus cocincinus

= Chinese water dragon =

Species of lizard

Physignathus cocincinus is a species of agamid lizard native to southern China and mainland Southeast Asia. It is commonly known as the Chinese water dragon, Indochinese water dragon, Asian water dragon, Thai water dragon, or green water dragon.

Chinese water dragons are large diurnal lizards adapted for dense subtropical forests replete with unpolluted streams. They are semi-arboreal, roosting at night on branches overlooking streams, which offer an escape route when the lizards are disturbed. Arthropods are their main source of food, though worms, snails, vertebrates, and plants make up a notable portion of the diet as well. Males are territorial towards each other and bear display features such as crests and jowls. Females are oviparous and reproduce sexually in the wild, though at least one captive Chinese water dragon is known to have reproduced via parthenogenesis. Physignathus cocincinus is related to Australasian lizards in the subfamily Amphibolurinae. One amphibolurine, the Australian water dragon (Intellagama lesuerii) is so anatomically and ecologically similar to Physignathus cocincinus that it was once (erroneously) placed in the same genus.

Feral populations introduced to Hong Kong and Taiwan flourish in high densities despite countermeasures in the latter territory. Their populations are also stable (albeit not widespread) in protected areas of Thailand. However, in the rest of their native range, Chinese water dragons have seen sharp population declines in recent decades. They are listed as a Vulnerable species at risk of extinction in the future, based on current trends. The largest threat to the species is overharvesting for meat and the pet trade. Their meat is in high demand in Vietnam, and captive breeding is currently incapable of replacing wild collection by hunters and poachers. Due to their charismatic appearance, captured Chinese water dragons are sold as pets for both local and international markets. Yearly exports to the European Union and the United States number in the tens of thousands, all of which are taken from wild populations. Habitat loss is another source of pressure, as undisturbed streamside forest is converted into cropland or subjected to illegal logging and other human activities.

== Taxonomy ==
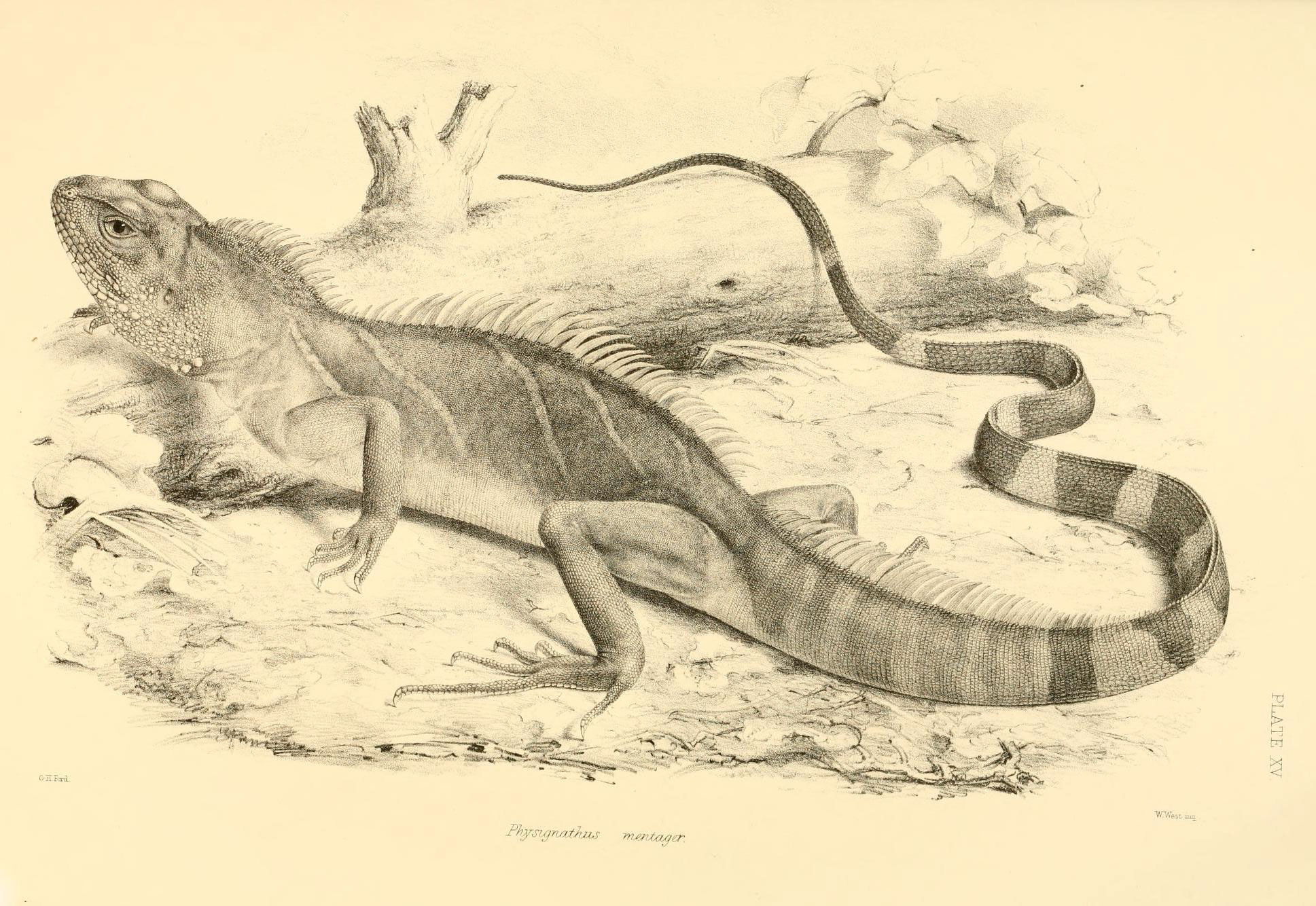
Illustration from 1864

The species and genus were first described by Georges Cuvier in 1829. Cuvier's original spelling, 'Phyhignat,us cocincinus', is likely a printing error. The epithet cocincinus is from the French term Cocincine, for the type locality Cochin-china (an exonym of Vietnam).

During the 19th and 20th centuries, several other species of agamid lizards were placed in Cuvier's genus Physignathus. These have been reclassified into separate genera, leaving Physignathus with only the original species P. cocincinus remaining. For example, the Australian water dragon (Intellagama lesueurii) was known as Physignathus lesueurii for much of its history.

According to most genetic analyses, Physignathus cocincinus is the sister taxon or the most basal (earliest branching) species of the agamid subfamily Amphibolurinae. All other amphibolurines are native to Australia or New Guinea, including bearded dragons (Pogona spp.), the frilled lizard (Chlamydosaurus kingii), the thorny devil (Moloch horridus), the Australian water dragon, and many others. A 2000 paper estimated that Physignathus cocincinus diverged from the Australasian amphibolurines up to 120 million years ago, though subsequent studies support a more recent divergence, around 30 million years ago.

== Description ==
Adult Chinese water dragons are large and robust lizards; males can grow up to 90 cm (3.0 ft) in total length, including the tail. The tail is very long, exceeding 70% of the total body length. The maximum snout-vent length (tail excluded) is about 25 cm (9.8 in) in males and 20 cm (7.9 in) in females. The body and tail are compressed (taller than wide) while the limbs are long and muscular, each ending at five sharp claws. In both sexes, a fringe of enlarged scales runs down the length of the spine. The tympanum (eardrum) is partially exposed, with its rim covered by scales. There is a row of 8 or 9 large white plate-like scales on the edge of the lower jaw, below the infralabials (the scale row of the lower lip).

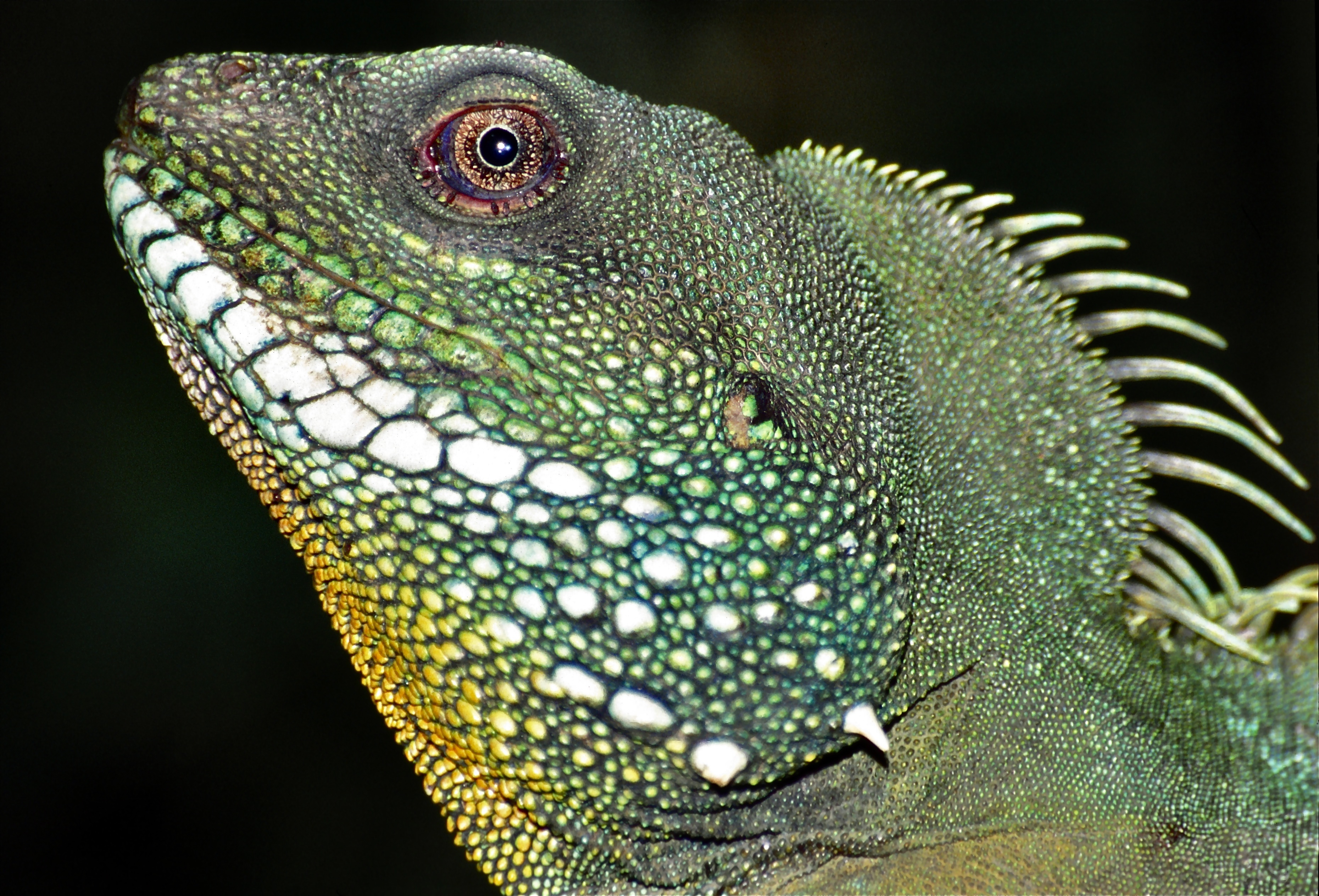
Head of an adult male at Khao Yai National Park, Thailand

Chinese water dragons show distinct sexual dimorphism; the males are heavier (up to 0.6 kg or 1.3 lbs) and have prominent display features. An arched crest extends along the rear of the neck onto the back, and another low crest is present at the base of the tail. The head is larger and more triangular, while the cheeks are swollen into jowls with pale tubercles (prominent pointed scales). There is no dewlap, unlike anoles and iguanas. Males have a functional series of femoral pores on the underside of the thigh, while in females these pores are little more than subtle indentations. Females reach a maximum weight 0.25 kg (0.55 lb), with a smaller head and lower crests.

Coloration is usually a shade of bright green, though they can take on a brown or grey hue when stressed. In juveniles, the body has vibrant green or turquoise diagonal stripes, which may fade with maturity. Most of the tail is ornamented with thick bands of alternating light green and dark brown. In some individuals a dark stripe stretches between the eye and the ear. In most areas the undersides are pale in color, but the throat takes on a more colorful shade of yellow or orange, especially in adult males. Scales on the cheek and lower jaw may acquire a blue or pink coloration in adults.

== Distribution ==
=== Native range ===
Chinese water dragons are native to the subtropical forests of southern China (Guangdong, Guangxi, and Yunnan provinces) and Southeast Asia (Vietnam, Laos, portions of Cambodia, eastern Thailand). There are also unconfirmed reports from Myanmar.

=== Introduced populations ===
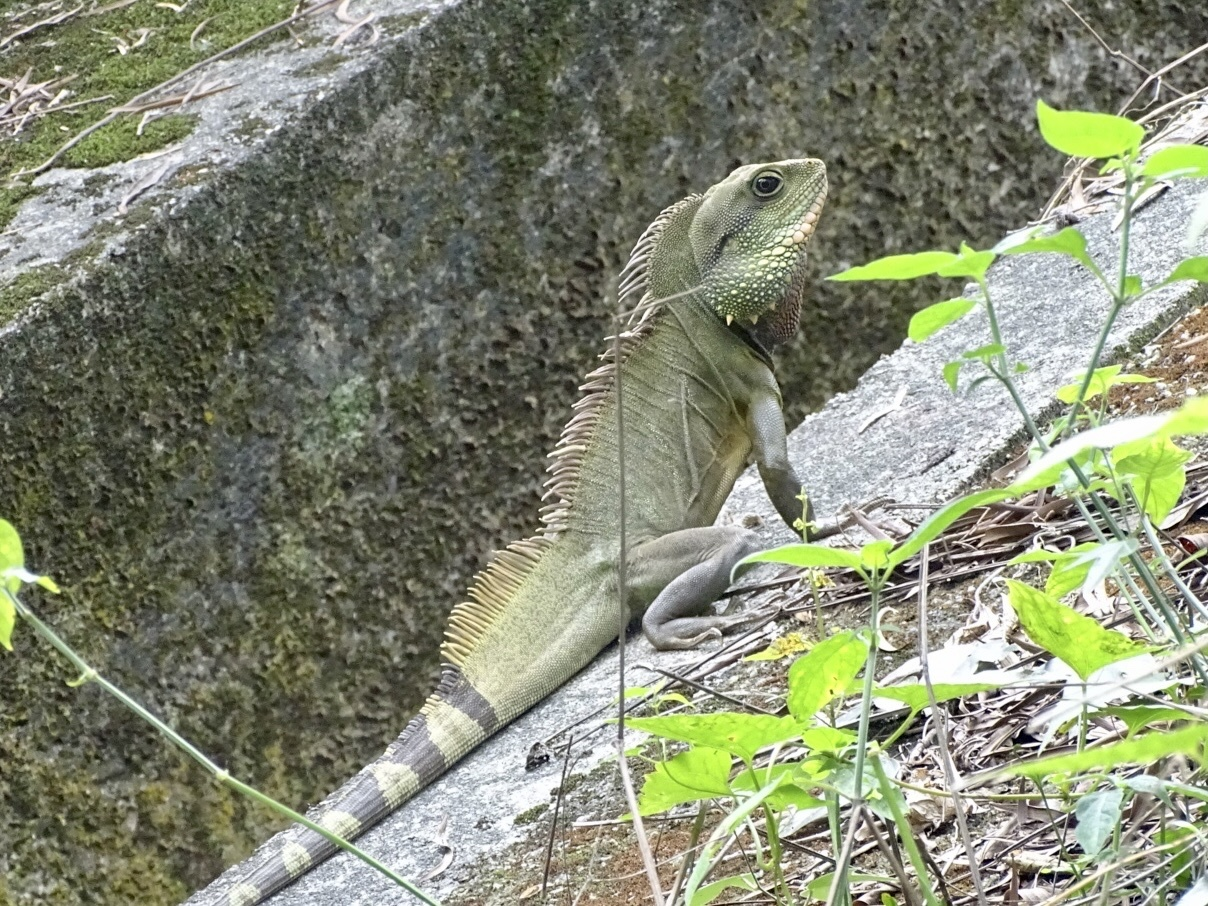
At Lion Rock Country Park in Hong Kong

An introduced population of Chinese water dragons has established itself in Hong Kong, probably from released pet animals. The first reports came from Tsing Yi Island in 2004, though the Hong Kong population likely originated from several releases. Since 2010, another breeding population has been established in New Taipei City, Taiwan. Hundreds of the lizards were culled from 2013 to 2017 over concerns about their impact on native Taiwanese wildlife. Introduced individuals (but not breeding populations) have also been reported from Malaysia and Florida.

=== Habitat ===
Chinese water dragons are most commonly found within dense closed evergreen forest along the banks of freshwater streams. They live in a humid climate with mild seasons: average humidity levels of 40–80% and temperatures ranging from 80–90 °F (27–32 °C). Their reliance on undisturbed forest streams indicates that, despite their wide extent of occurrence in southeast Asia, Chinese water dragons are a geographically restricted species. They can be found between elevations of around 50 and 820 meters (160 and 2,690 feet), though their density and abundance decline strongly above around 270 meters (890 feet).

Despite their preference for undisturbed habitat, Chinese water dragons are common in the urban parks of Hong Kong. Nevertheless, they show a systematic preference for areas with streamside boulders, taller trees, and a denser canopy. Though all sampled individuals have streams within their territory, less than half of first-hand recordings occur within close proximity (< 5 meters) to a stream. Males prefer to defend wide or deep streams while female territories occupy more dry land. Rocks and concrete structures are frequented for basking spots. Orchards are avoided, since they offer no benefits for protection (relative to dense forests) or heat retention (relative to concrete).

== Behavior and ecology ==
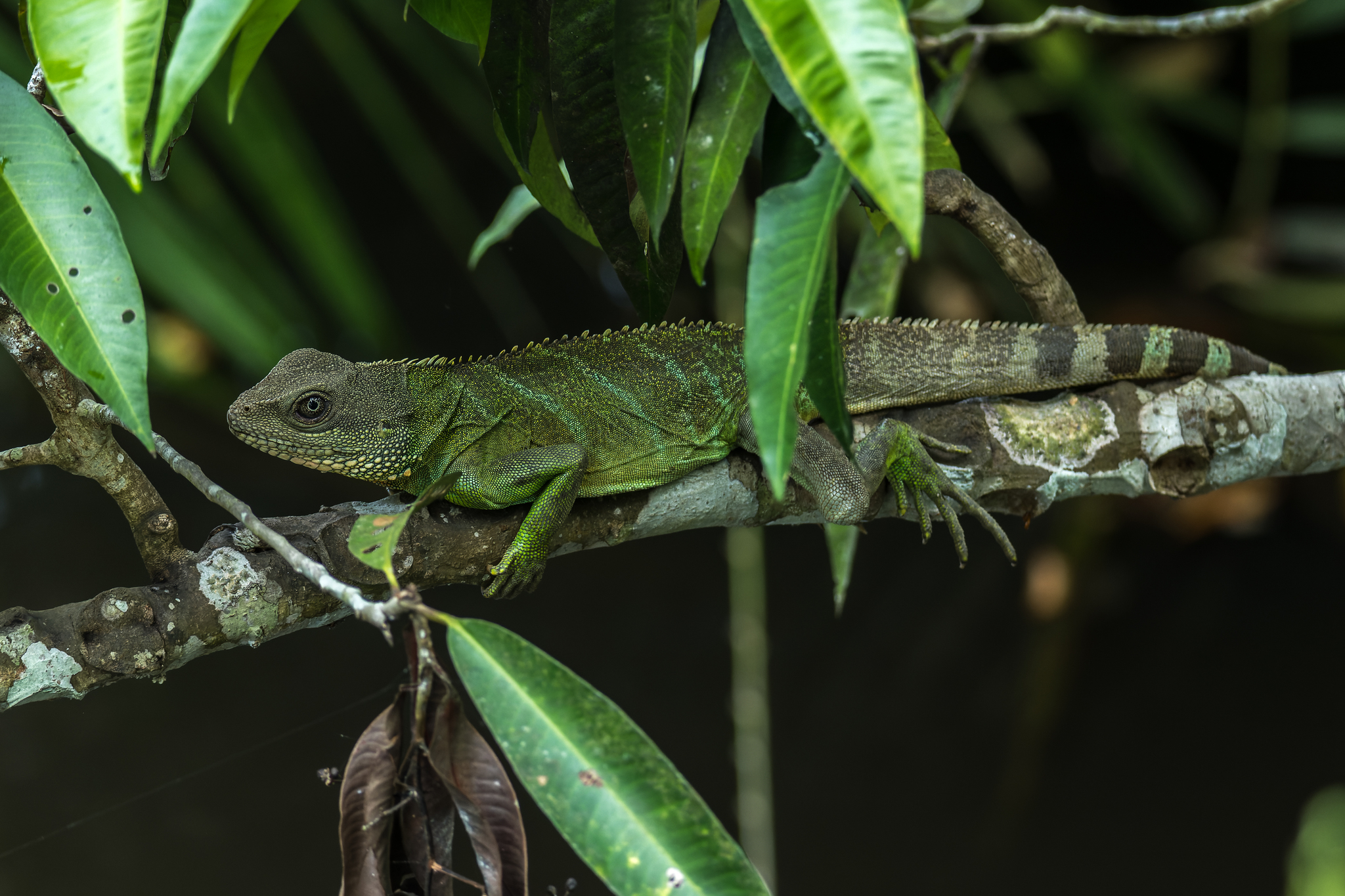
Resting on a tree limb in Pak Chong district, Thailand

Chinese water dragons are diurnal (active during the day) and forage for prey within small territories in the morning and midday. They are also semi-arboreal (spending much of their time in trees or plants). Adult males in particular tend to rest during the night on tree limbs overlooking streams. If threatened, a Chinese water dragon will leap or run to the nearest stream and either swim to safety or remain submerged for up to 90 minutes.

In Hong Kong, the average territory size is about 1800 m^{2}, with a small daily range of about 5 meters on average. Male territories generally do not overlap with each other, arguing that males are much more territorial than females. Movement and range patterns appear to be similar between the hot and wet summer and the relatively cool and dry winter, unlike most other subtropical reptiles. This may be an unintentional artefact of the fact that Hong Kong's dry season during the study interval (2015–2016) was unusually warm and wet. Captive male water dragons are very aggressive towards each other while females and juveniles are more tolerant.

=== Diet ===
Chinese water dragons are omnivorous and will readily supplement their diet with non-toxic vegetables or fruits in captivity. Nevertheless, their diet consists mainly of insects with occasional small vertebrates, eggs, and snails. Introduced Chinese water dragons in Taiwan are known to prey on native lizards, frogs, snakes, and mice.

According to a 2018 survey in Central Vietnam, Chinese water dragons persist on a diverse variety of terrestrial invertebrates. Termites, ants, orthopterans (grasshoppers and crickets), earthworms, and spiders all make up a significant portion of the diet, along with insect larvae, snails, and various other prey items. Plant material was eaten very rarely by the subjects of this study, though other accounts testify that plants make up a significant portion of the diet in the wild.

=== Reproduction and life history ===
Chinese water dragons are oviparous, with a clutch of 5 to 16 eggs buried in sandy riverbanks near the end of the dry winter. The eggs hatch two or three months later in the early part of the wet summer. Maturity is met within the first year, and the generation length is about 6 years. Captive females may breed several times per year. Healthy captive Chinese water dragons have a life expectancy of 10 to 15 years, though some can exceed 20 years of age.

Though they reproduce sexually in the wild, there is one reported case of facultative parthenogenesis in a captive individual. A female housed at the Smithsonian National Zoo produced viable offspring in 2016 and 2018, along with numerous unfertilized and nonviable eggs. The two surviving offspring are homozygous or hemizygous at seven particular microsatellite loci in the genome. This condition would be nearly impossible if sexual reproduction was involved, since at least a few of the seven microsatellite loci would be expected to be heterozygous. Physignathus cocincinus is the only agamid known to reproduce via parthenogenesis, though the low hatch rate suggests that this is an accidental occurrence rather than an ingrained evolutionary strategy.

== Threats and conservation ==
Though locally abundant in some areas, the Chinese water dragon faces persistent unrestrained threats and a steadily declining wild population. It is listed as Vulnerable in Vietnamese conservation lists, and Endangered in Thailand and China. On an international scale, the IUCN has rated it as a Vulnerable species since 2017. In accordance with a 2022 proposal, the Chinese water dragon has been listed on CITES Appendix II (requiring a CITES-approved permit for export) since 2023.

=== Population dynamics ===
At one site in Cambodia the species experienced a 50% population decline in 18 years, while a 2007 estimate considered the entire Vietnamese population to have declined by 20% over the previous decade. Based on these estimates, the species as a whole may be declining by 30% every 18 years.

A 2017 population survey in Thua Thien Hue Province, Vietnam estimated that up to 250 individuals in total were present at the 11 sampled sites (combined). This is far below the several thousand expected to sustain long-term genetic diversity for a species restrained to narrow riparian habitats. Sites sampled in June 2017 show a slightly lower population and a higher relative proportion of females and sub-adults relative to the same sites in April 2017. Adults were uncommon in both months while juveniles were most common in April, maturing into a large sub-adult cohort by June. Chinese water dragons in Thua Thien Hue occur at moderate to high densities, up to 2.6 per 100 meters in April 2017.

Somewhat different patterns were observed in a 2014–2016 survey in Northern Vietnam. In disturbed areas, Chinese water dragons occur at very low densities (as low as 0.17 per 100 meters in 2015), and adults make up to a third of the population. Several previously reported populations were probably extirpated, as individuals could not be found at 8 of the 15 investigated stream transects. Introduced populations in Hong Kong have a much higher population density (about 114 per 100 meters) than native Vietnamese populations.

=== Hunting and the pet trade ===
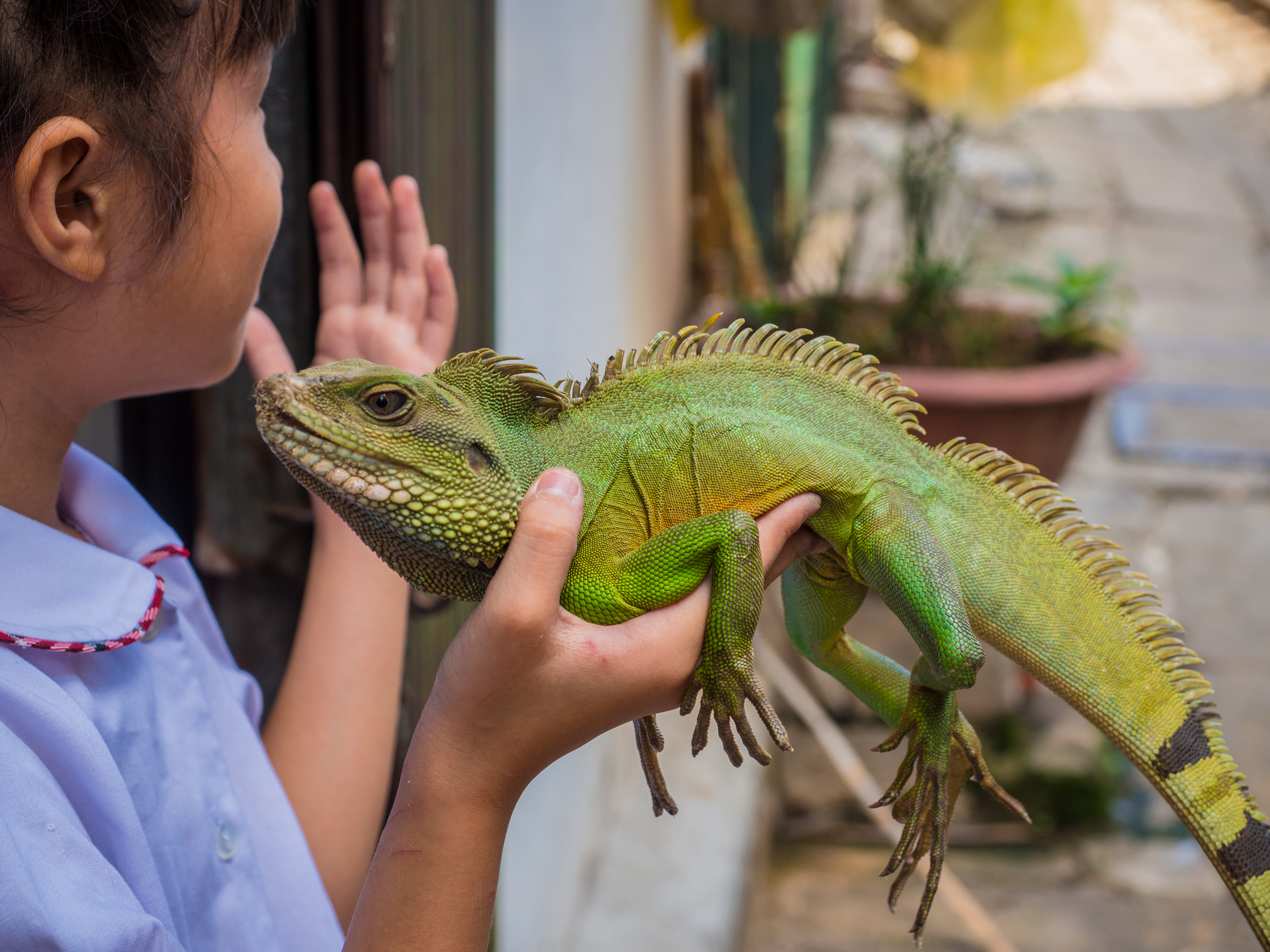
A pet Chinese water dragon in Hanoi, Vietnam

The most severe threat to the species is harvesting for meat and the pet trade. According to a series of 2016 interviews with 21 rural hunter groups, water dragons are a frequent and easy target of traps and hand collecting throughout Thua Thien Hue. Hunting pressure is greatest in May and June, with adult males prioritized due to their large size and conspicuous appearance. This agrees with the decreasing proportion of adult males found in June compared to April. Water dragon meat is typically sold to local restaurants, while eggs are stored in rice wine to be used as traditional medicine. Skins and leather are also traded and exported.

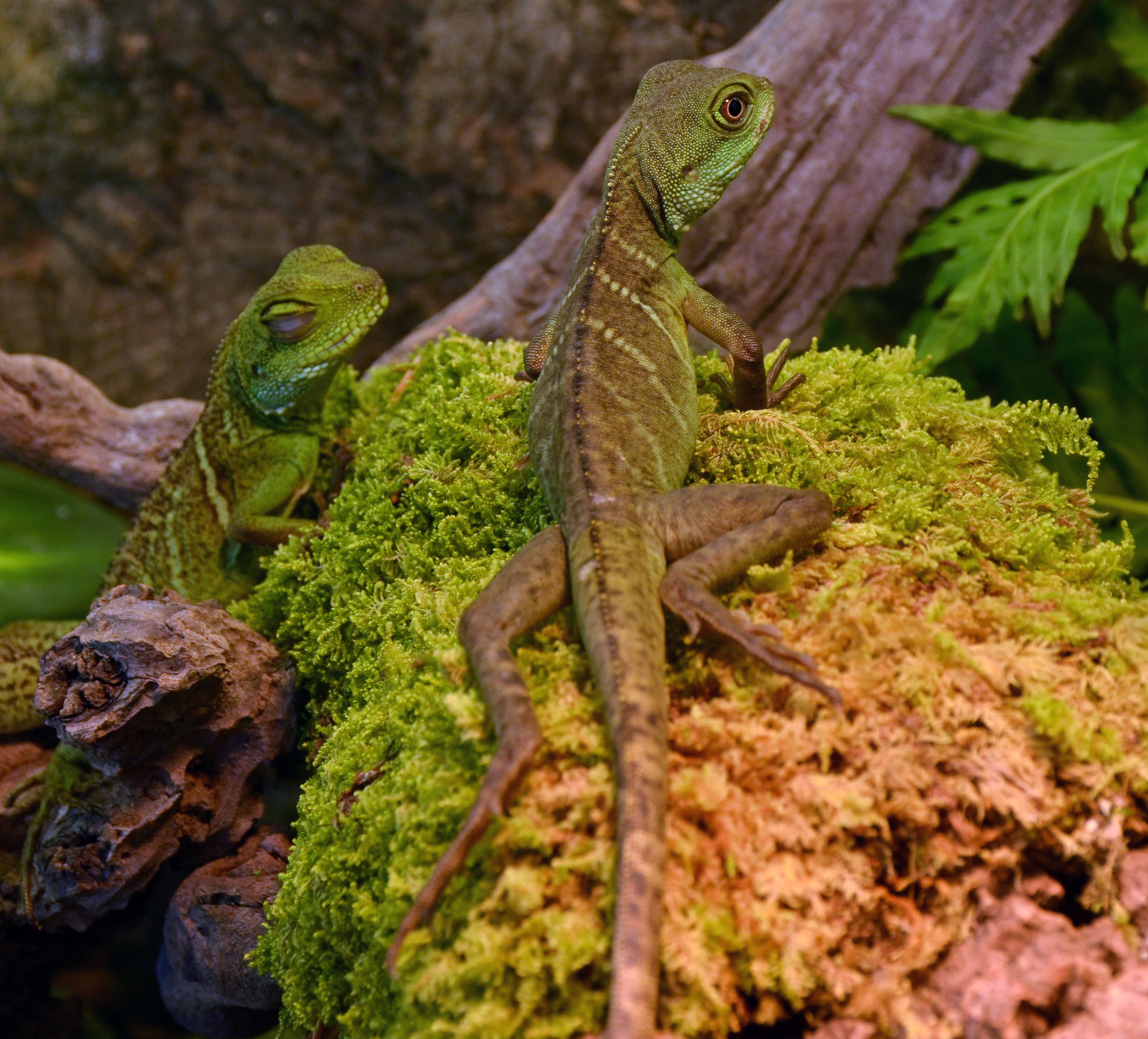
Captive juveniles at a reptile expo in Geneva, Switzerland

Wild water dragons are captured and sold as pets on social media platforms for both Vietnamese customers and the international markets of Europe and the United States. In Vietnam, about five times as many Chinese water dragons are sold for meat compared to those sold as pets. Exports to Europe began in 1975 and have accelerated in recent decades. From 2010 to 2018, a stable average of around 7,000 live Chinese water dragons per year were exported to the European Union. Approximately 89% came from Vietnam, though information on their production (wild caught or captive bred) is available for fewer than 13% of recorded exports to Europe.

Exports to the United States are even higher despite recent declines: an average of 81,000 per year from 2002 to 2011, and around 48,000 per year from 2013 to 2017. Practically all water dragons exported to the United States are Vietnamese in origin. At least 95% are wild caught while around 3% are reportedly captive bred in Vietnam. It is probable that some individuals sourced from Vietnam were actually collected from other nations, simply using the ports of Vietnam as a transit hub. Captive breeding is a viable but limited conservation strategy; Chinese water dragons breed readily in captivity, though not at a high enough rate to counteract demand. There is no direct evidence that captive breeding programs in Vietnam are in operation, despite claims of captive-bred exports.

=== Habitat loss ===
A smaller threat, though still impactful, is degradation or removal of the forested stream habitats which water dragons rely on. In Thua Thien Hue, illegal logging and a major highway construction project are likely partially responsible for losses in the Nam Dong and A Luoi districts. These pressures are less prevalent in the uplands of Phong Dien district, which seems to not experience the same degree of population decline. Logging and expansion of agricultural and tourism infrastructure also contribute to the paucity of suitable habitats in Northern Vietnam. Coal mining, stream pollution, and climate change may also threaten the species, as reported for ecologically similar reptiles in the region, such as the Chinese crocodile lizard (Shinisaurus crocodilurus).

Despite its common name, the Chinese water dragon is exceedingly rare in China, where it is threatened by dam construction on top of the same pressures as the Vietnamese populations. Suitably undeveloped habitats are uncommon in Cambodia and Laos. The few Chinese water dragons present in Thailand are stable and locally abundant thanks to their range lining up with protected areas such as Khao Yai National Park and Namtok Phlio National Park.

== Gallery ==
=== Wild individuals ===
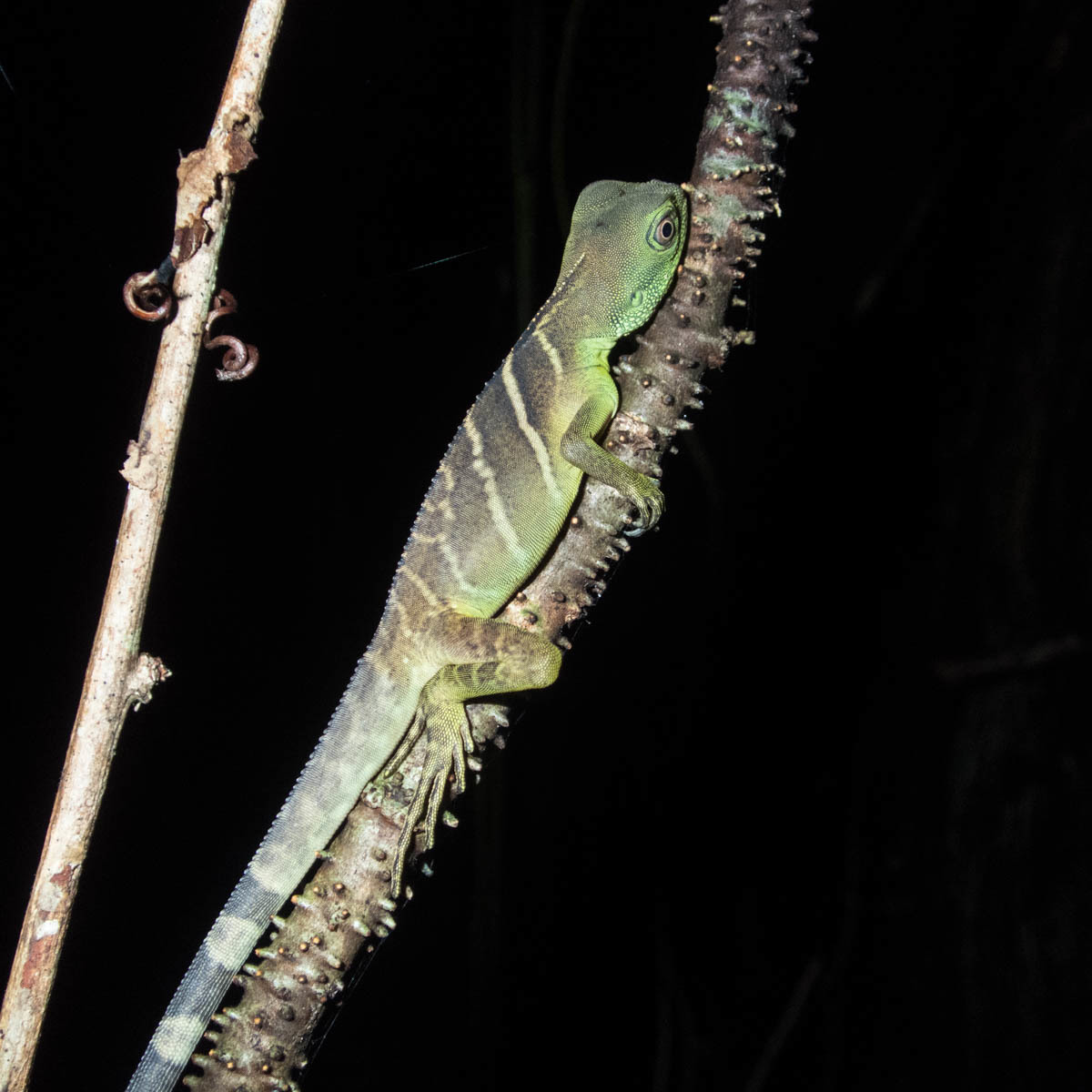
A juvenile in Cambodia

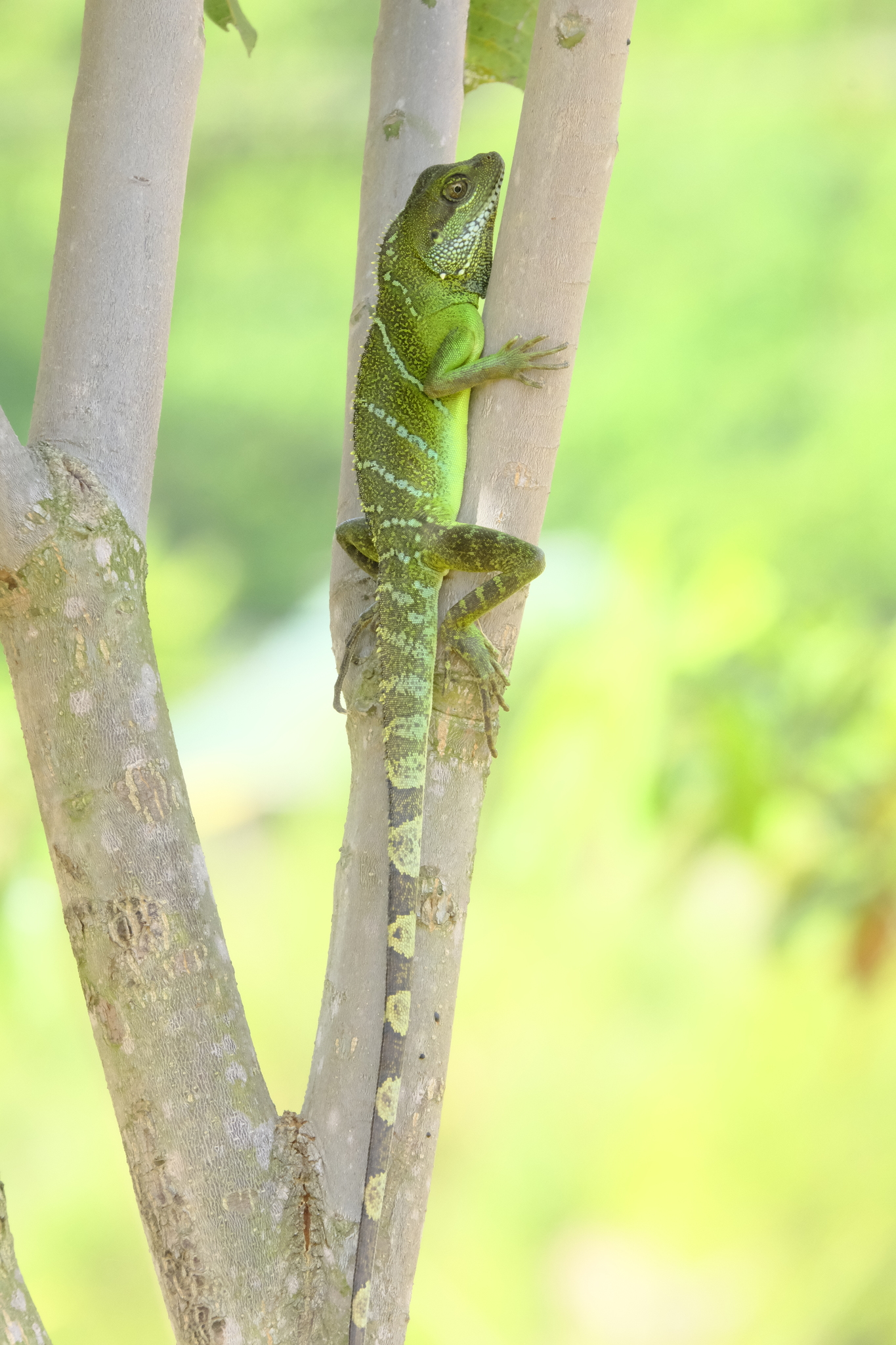
In southern Vietnam

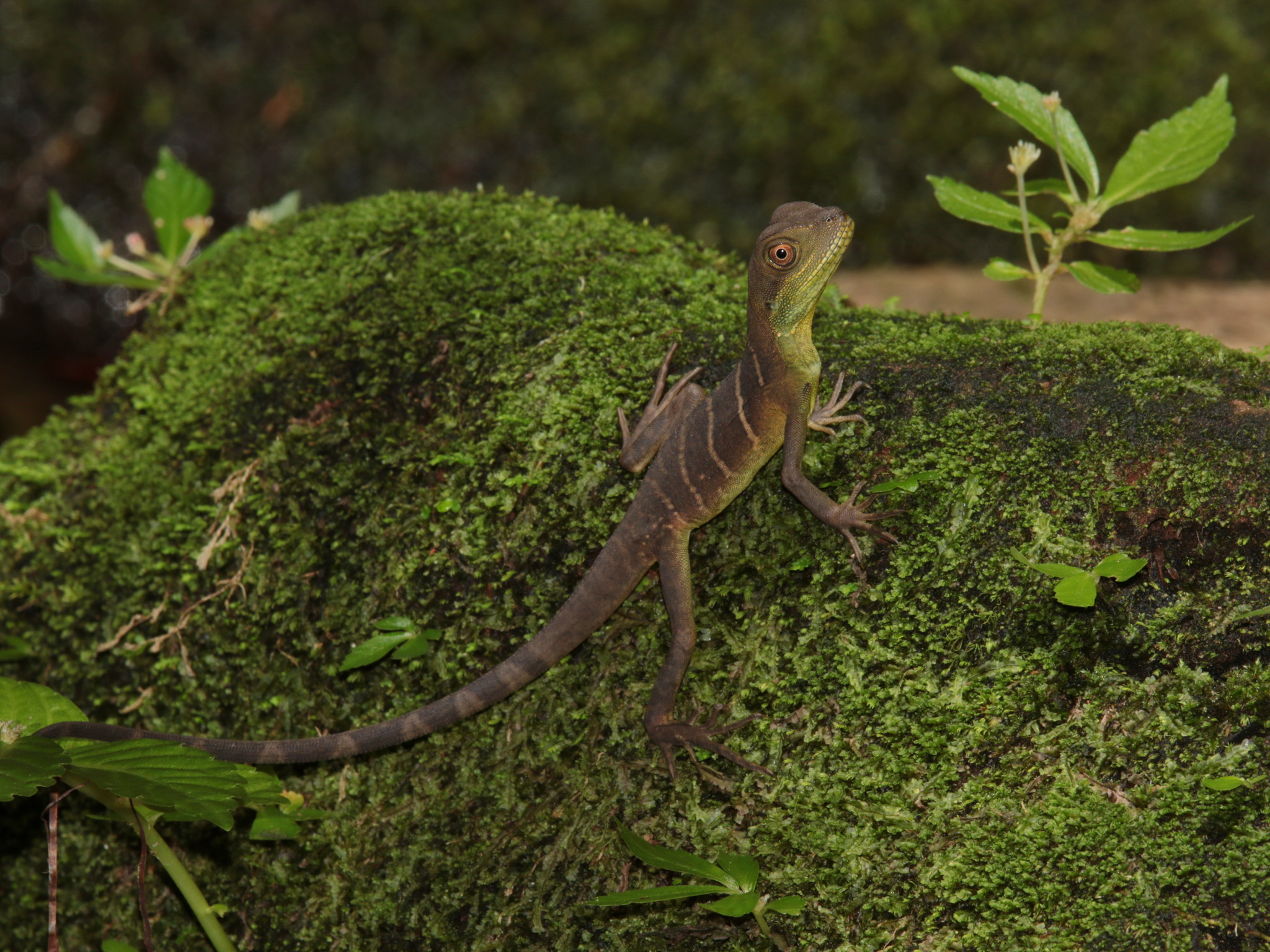
A juvenile in Seka district, Thailand

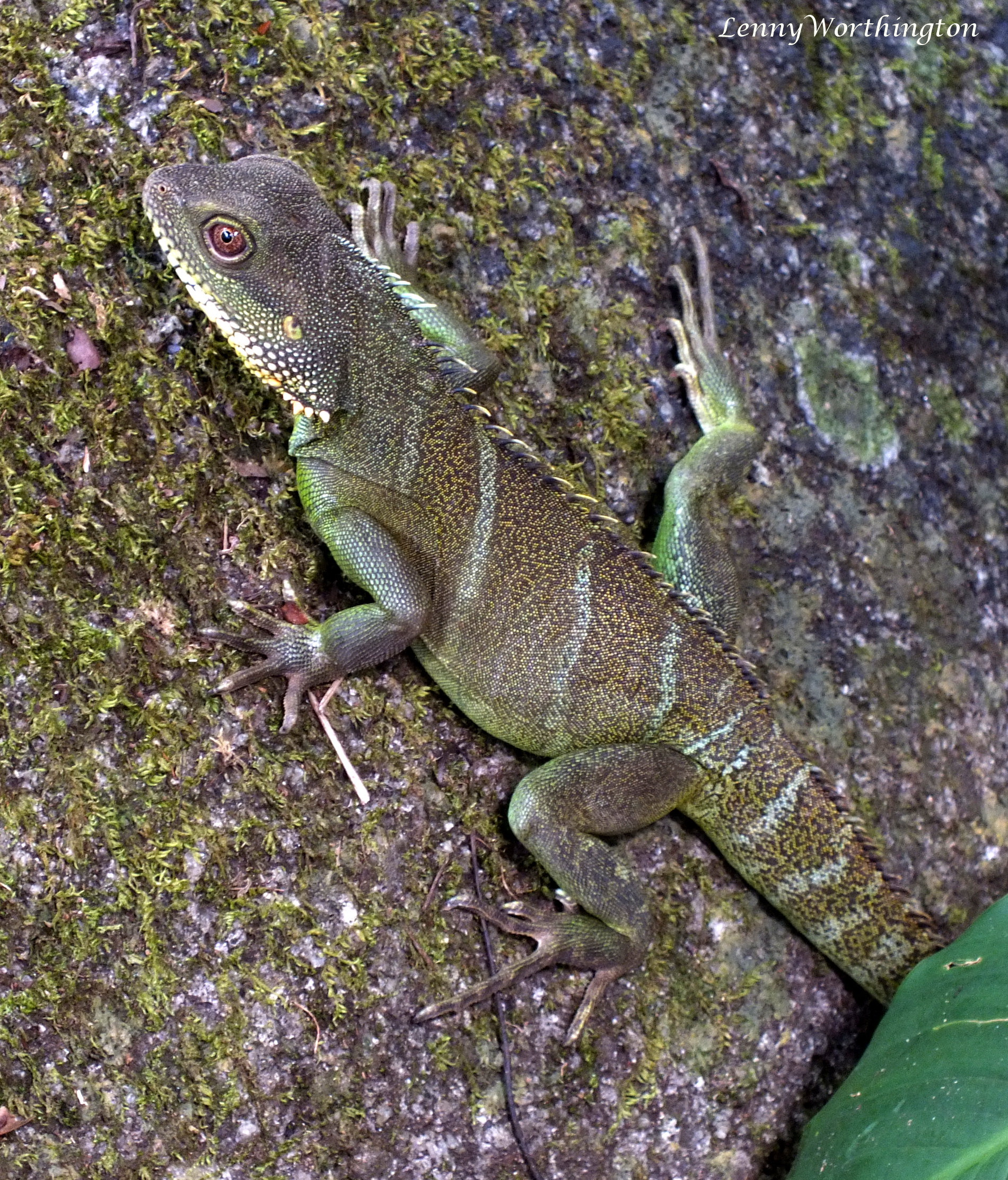
At Namtok Phlio NP, Thailand

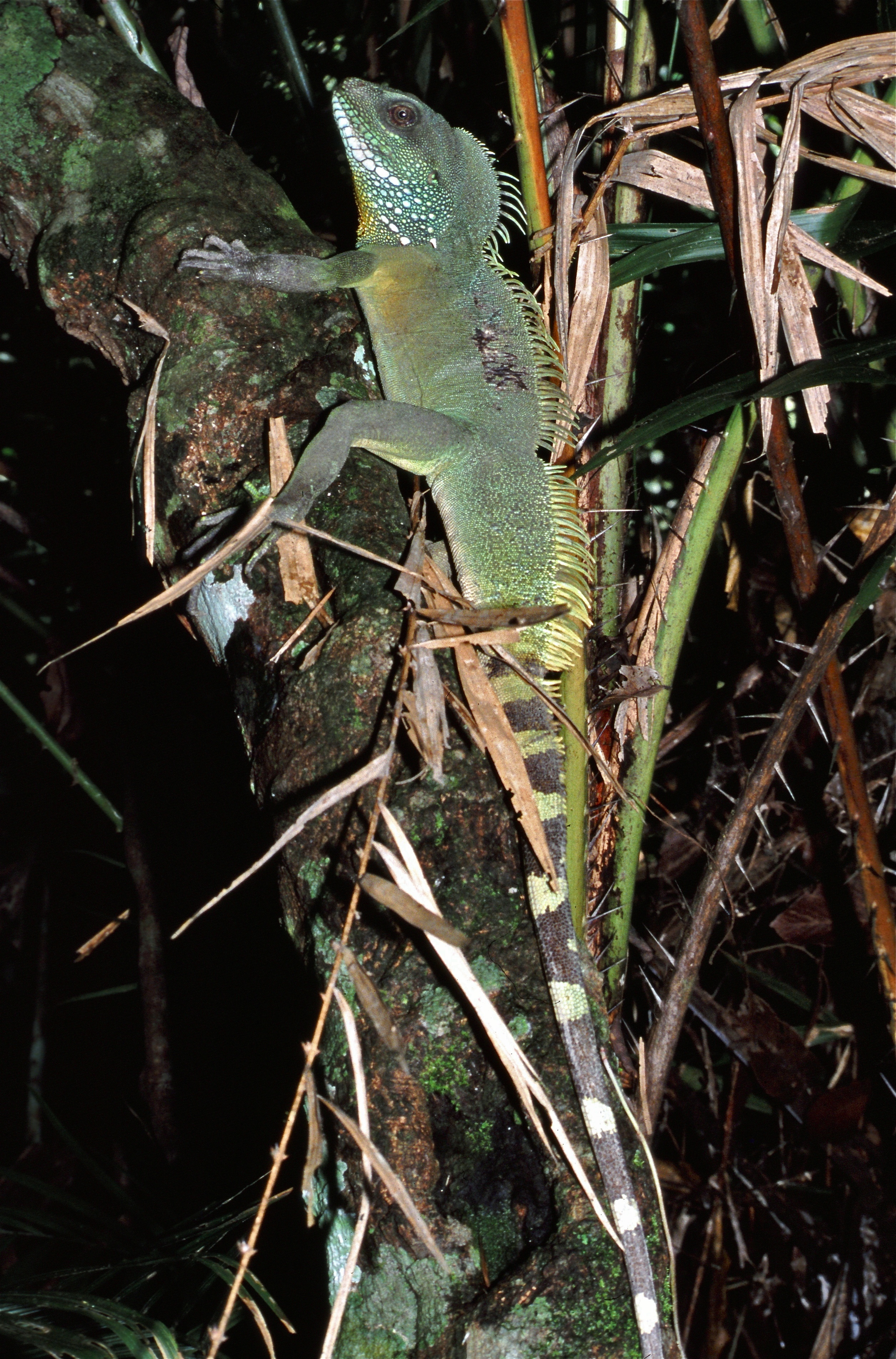
At Khao Yai NP, Thailand

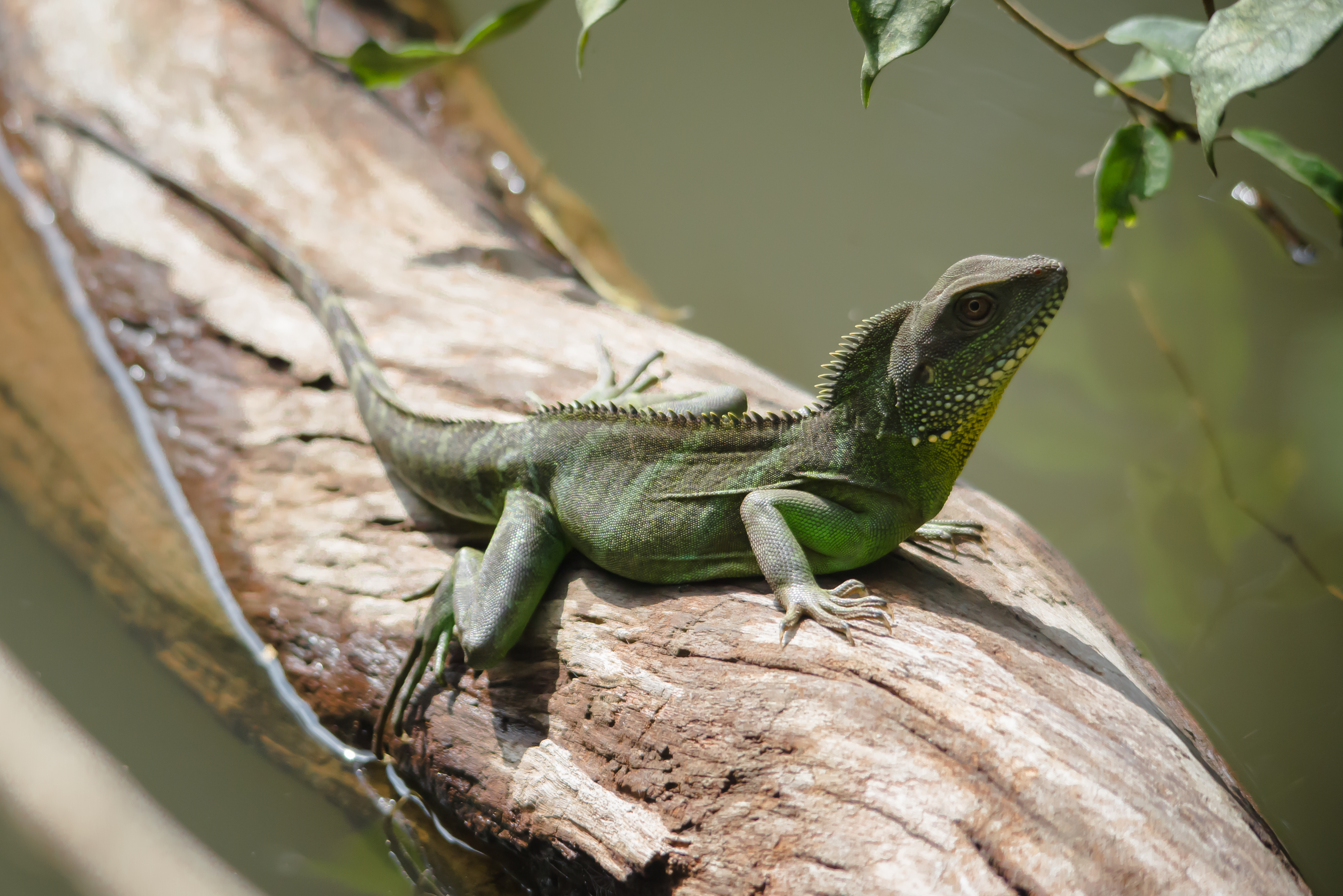
At Khao Yai NP, Thailand

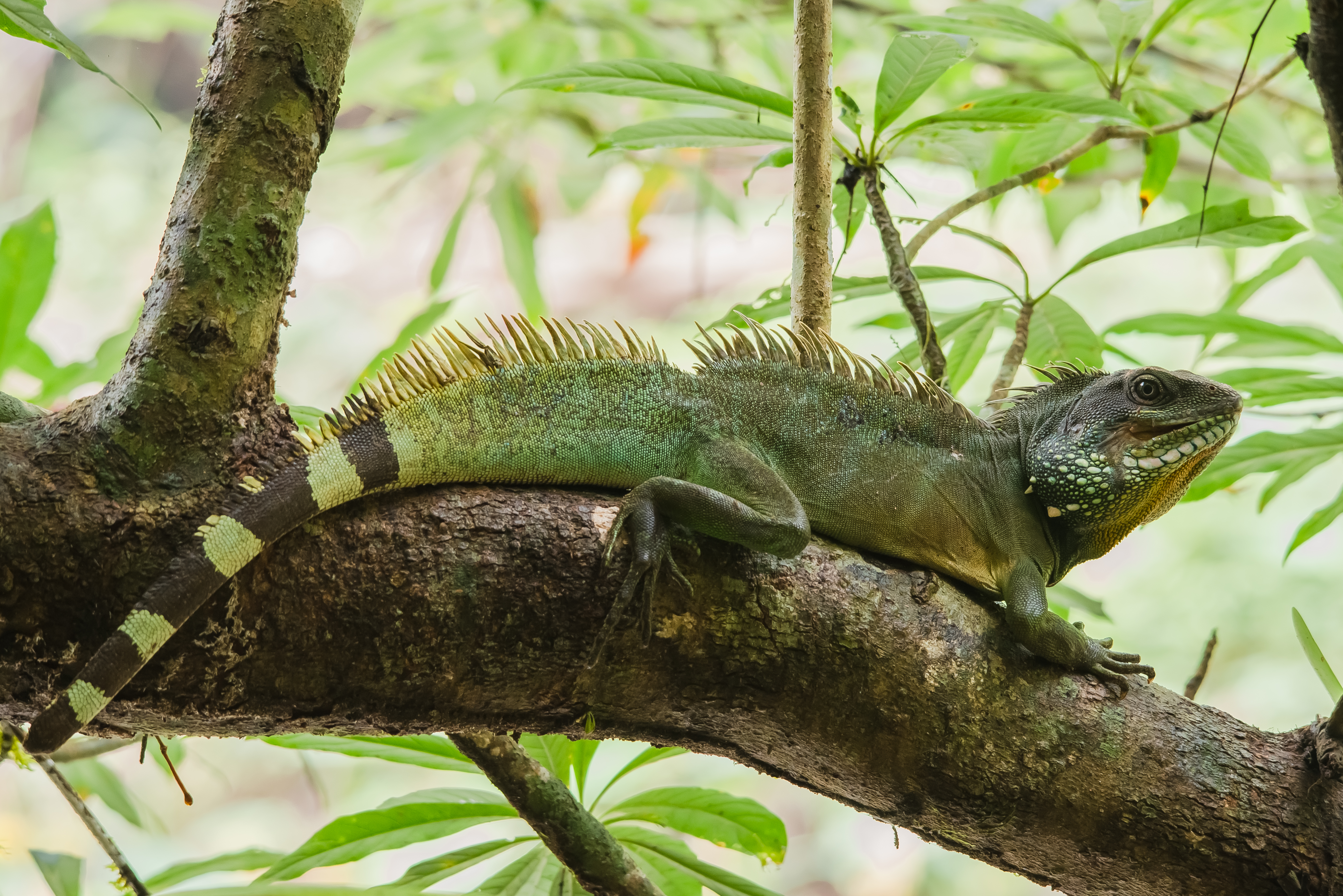
At Khao Yai NP, Thailand

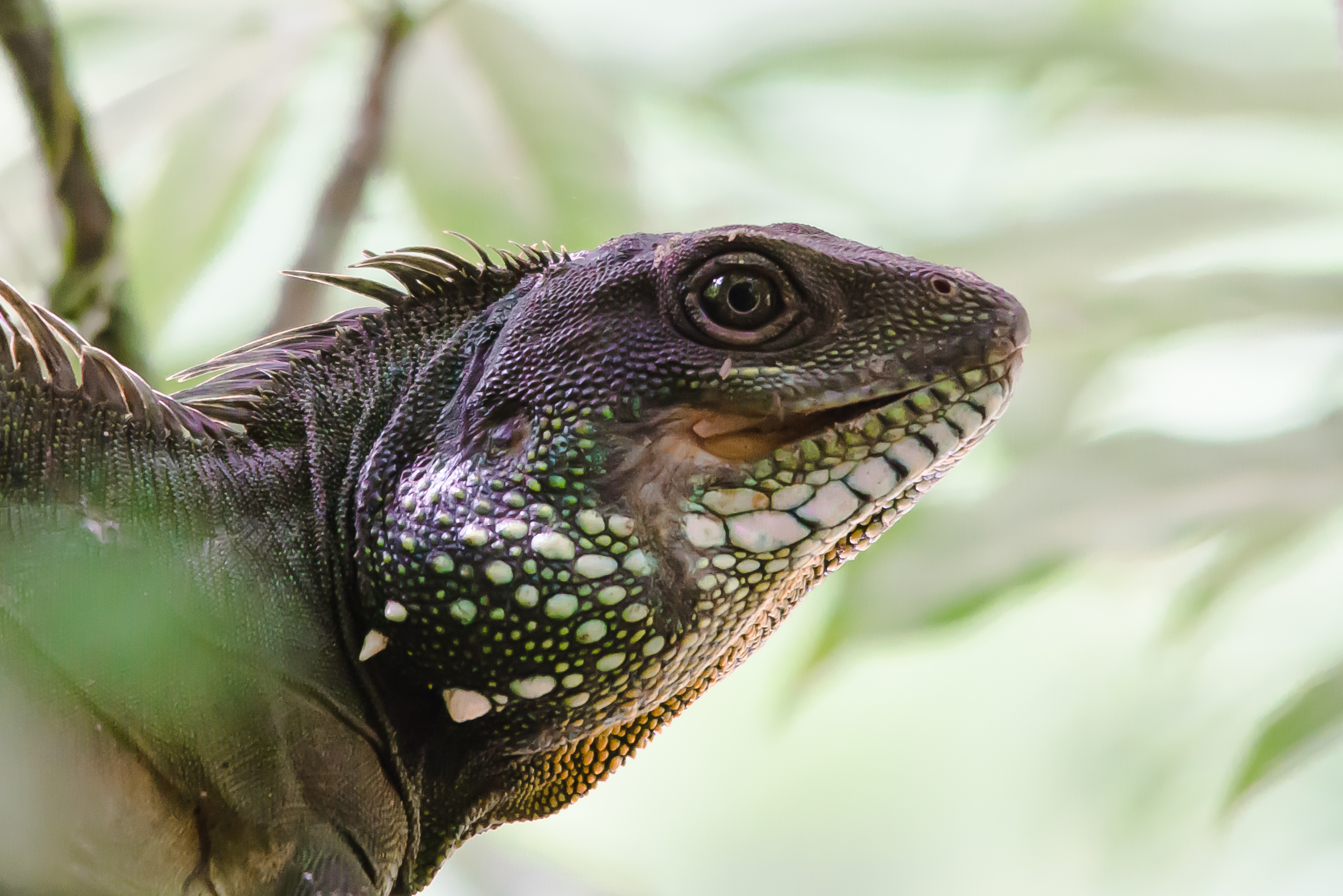
Detailed view of the head (Khao Yai NP, Thailand)

=== Captive individuals ===
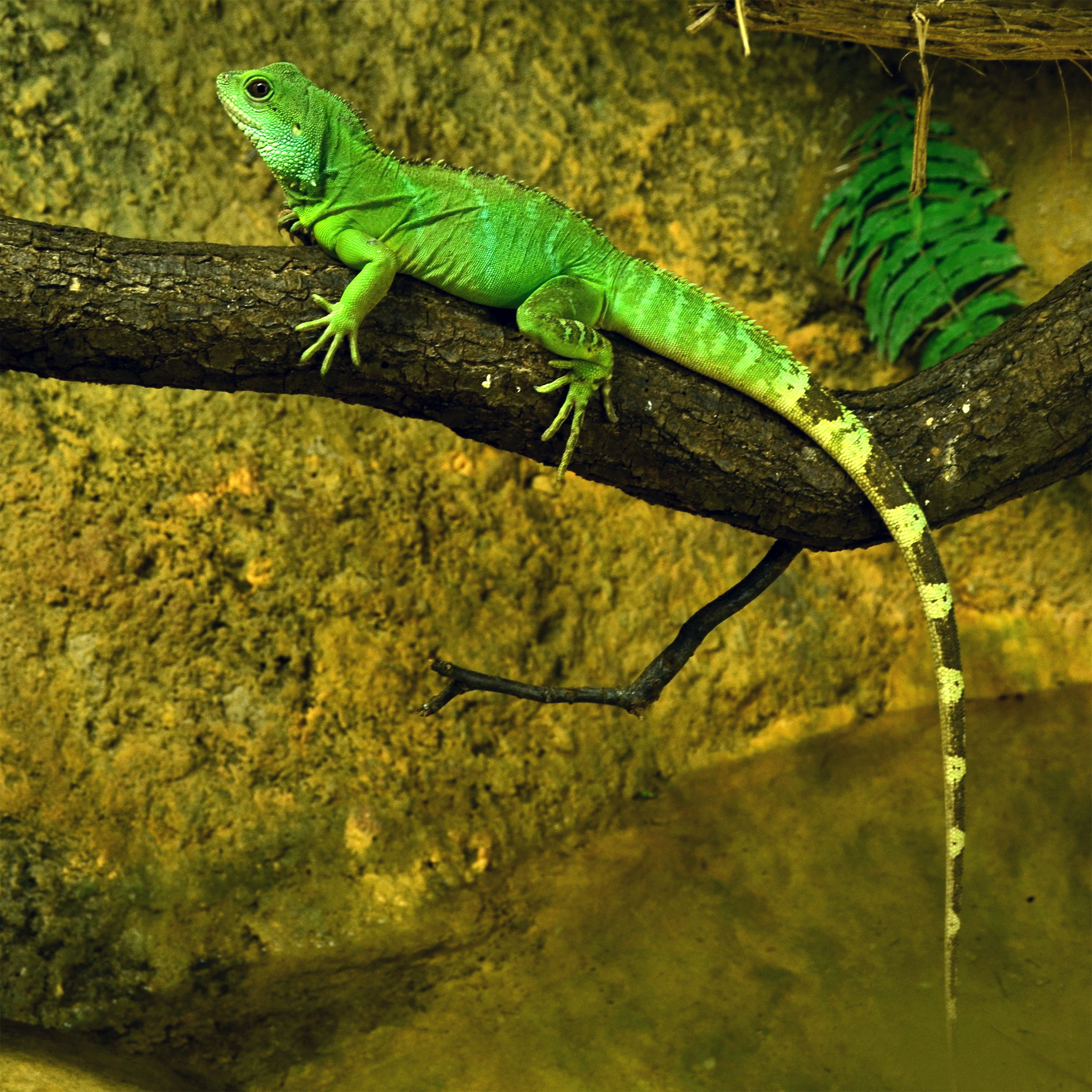
At Zoo d'Amnéville

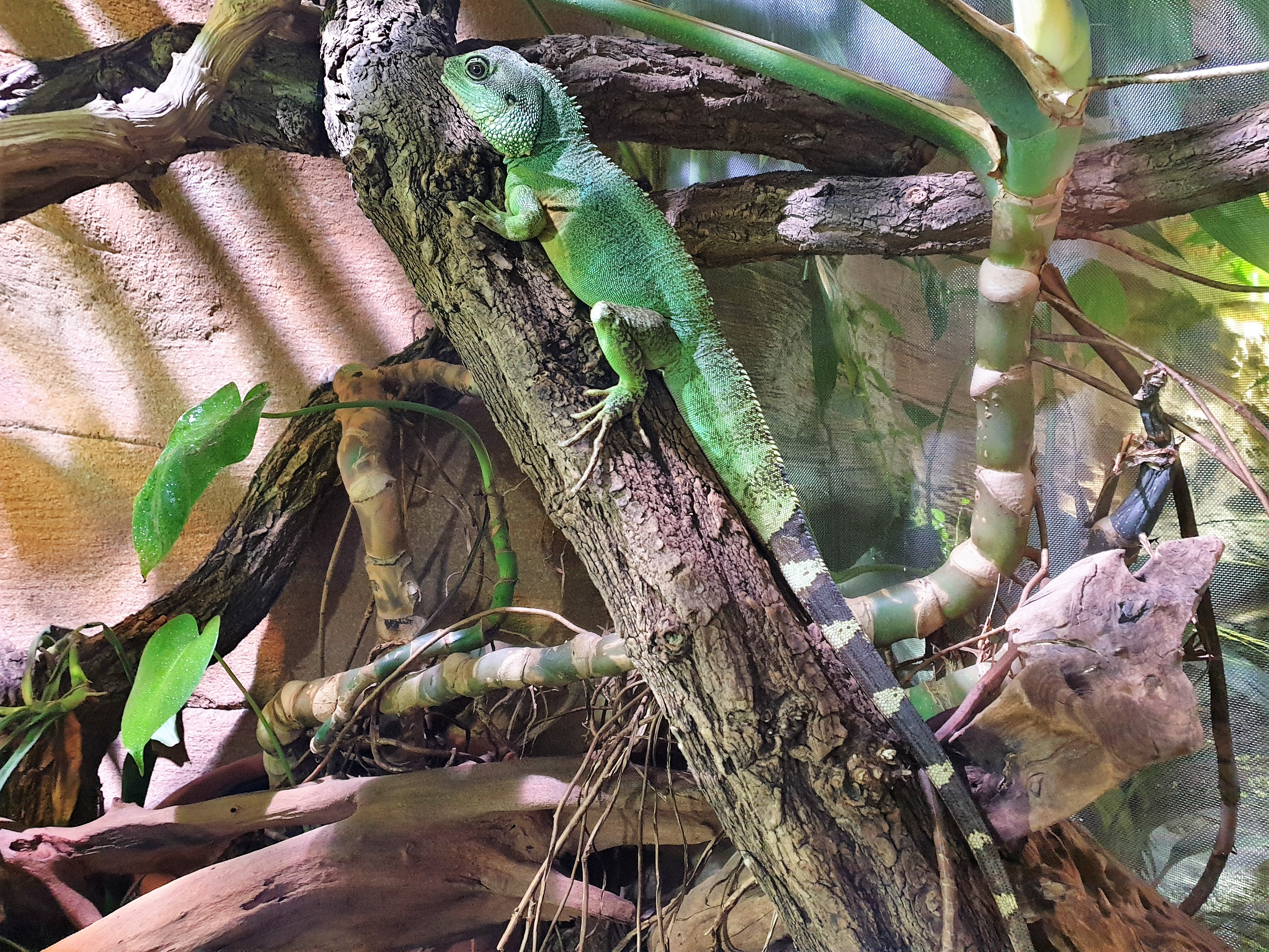
At Sea Life Hanover

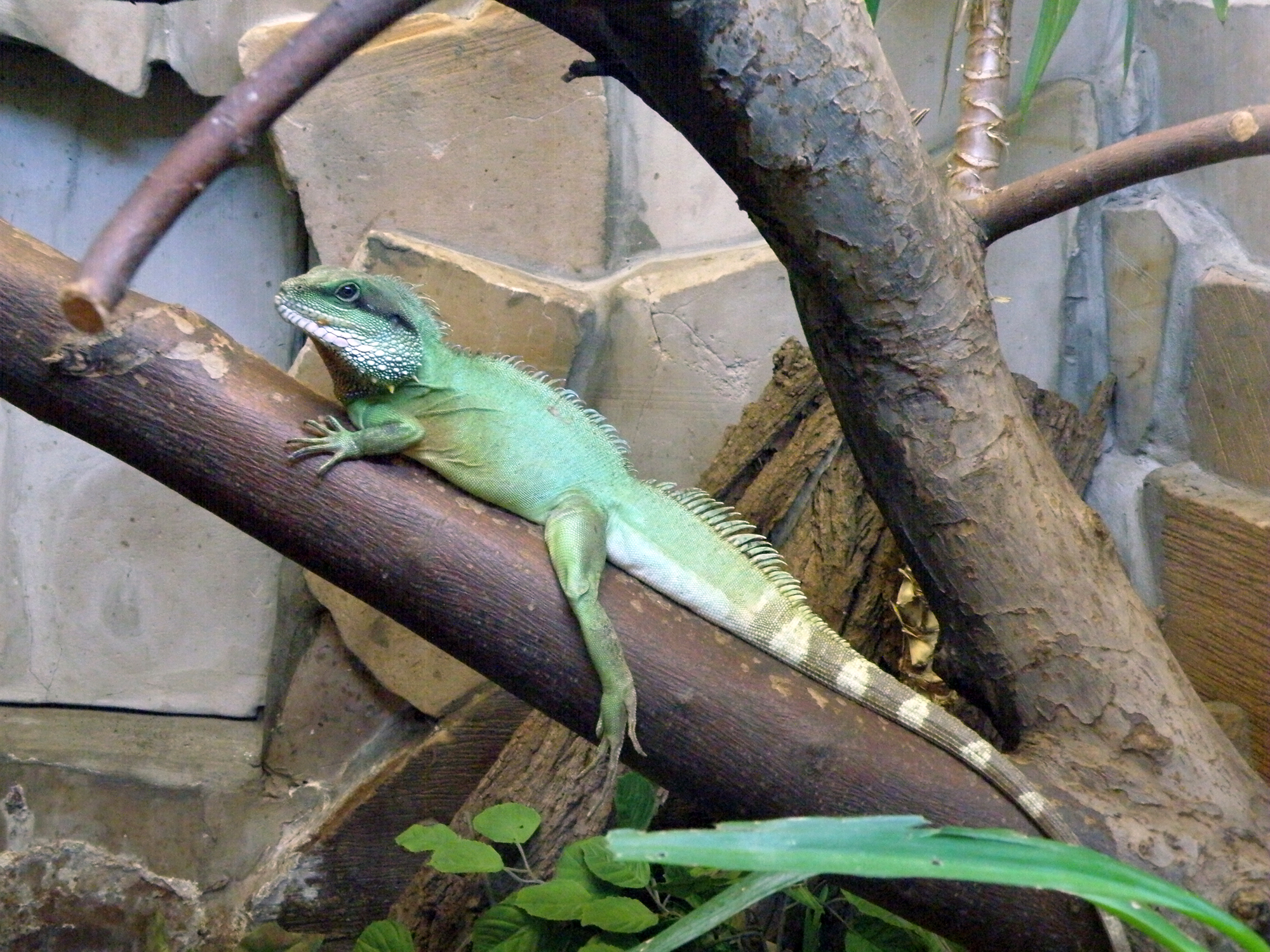
At Warsaw Zoo

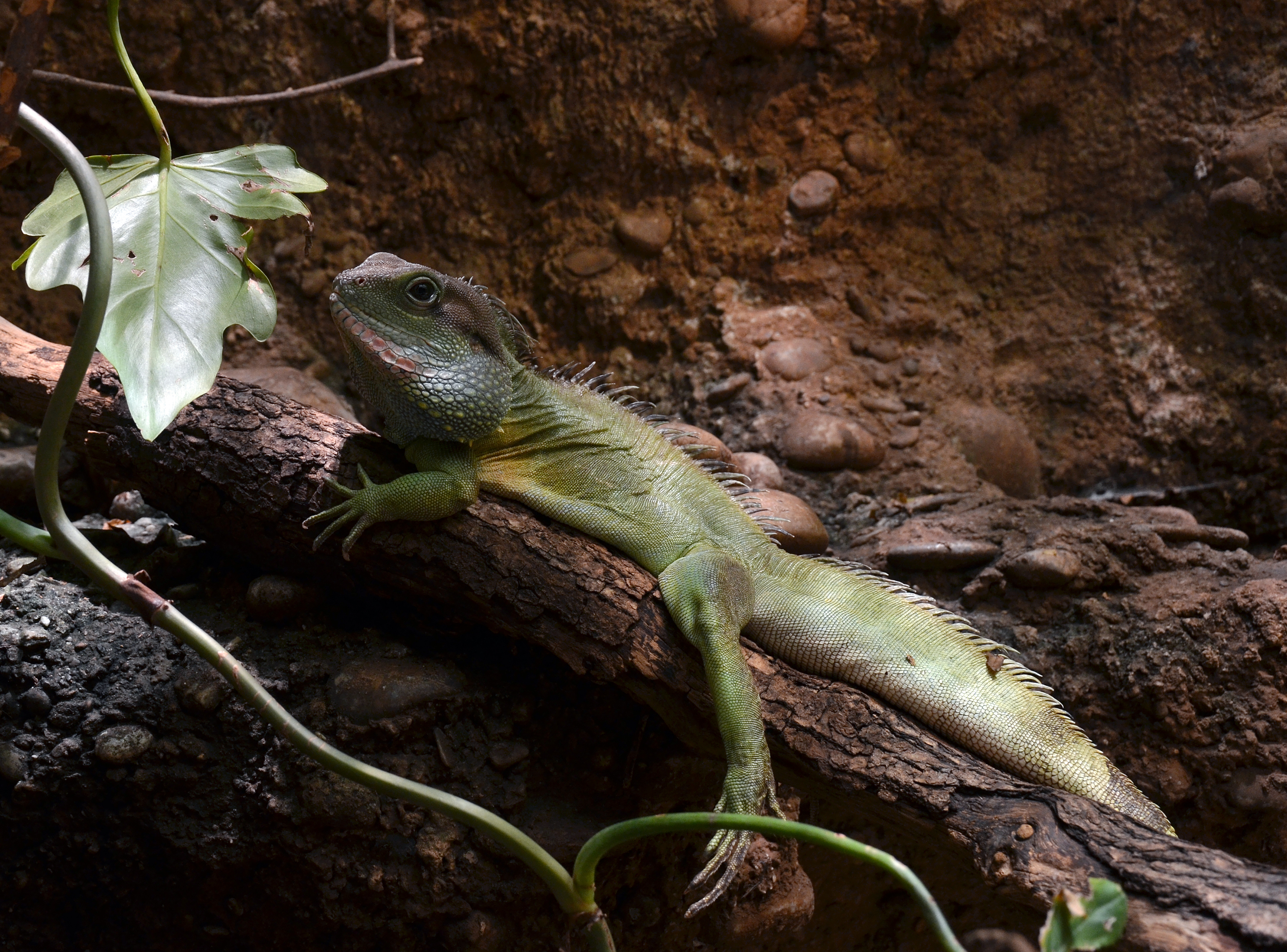
At Basel Zoo

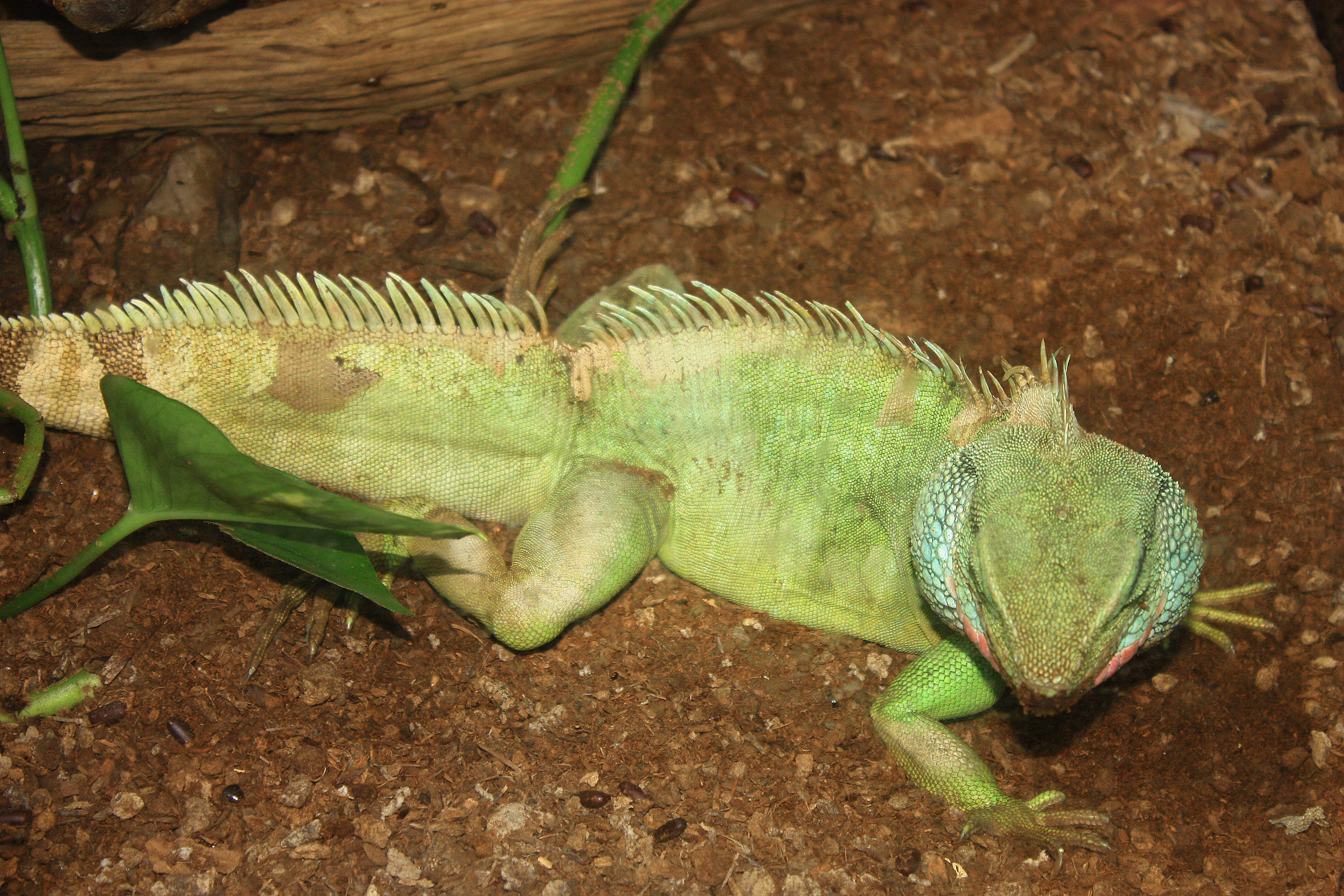
At Palmiarnia Poznańska

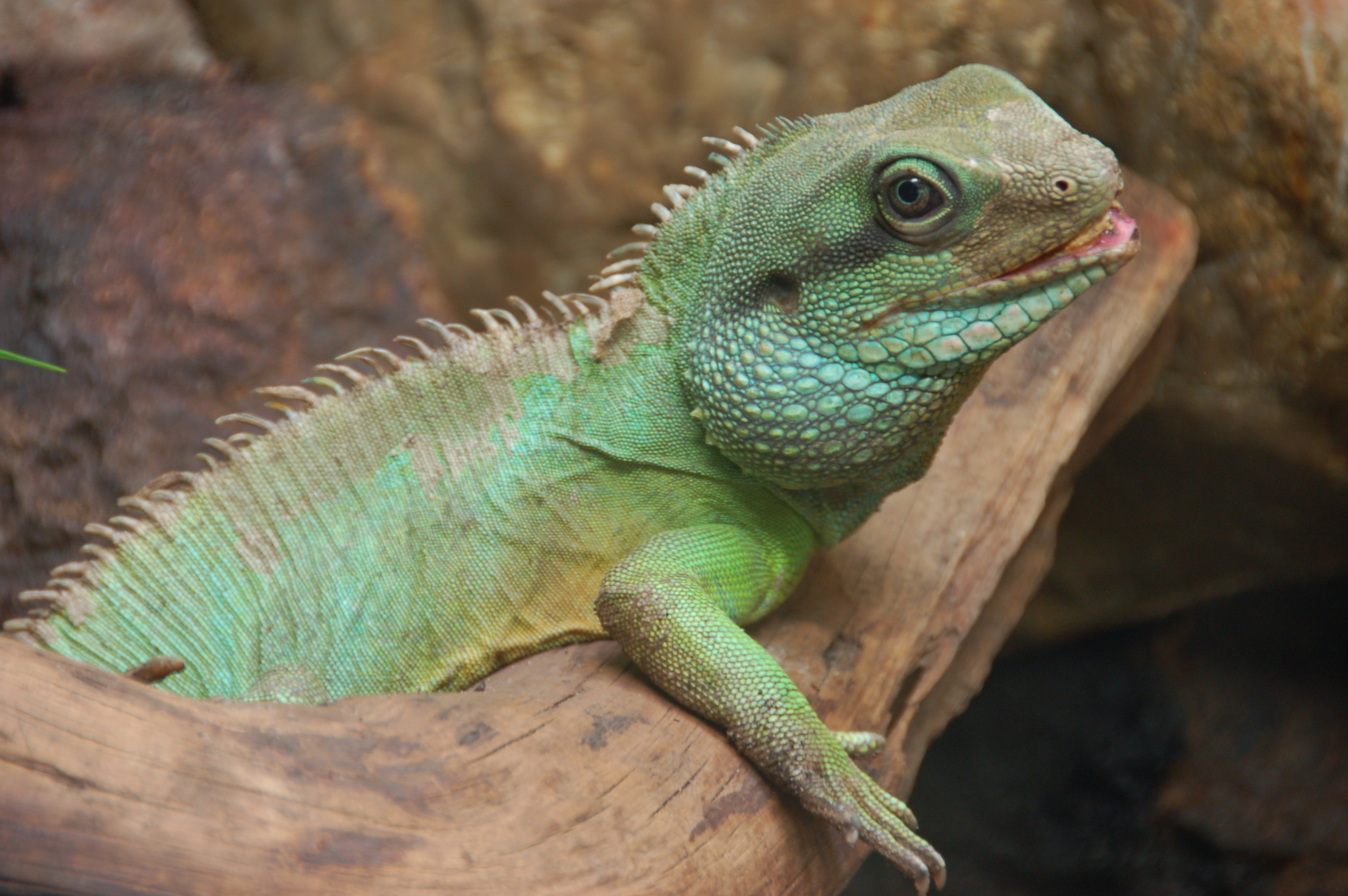
At Amsterdam Zoo

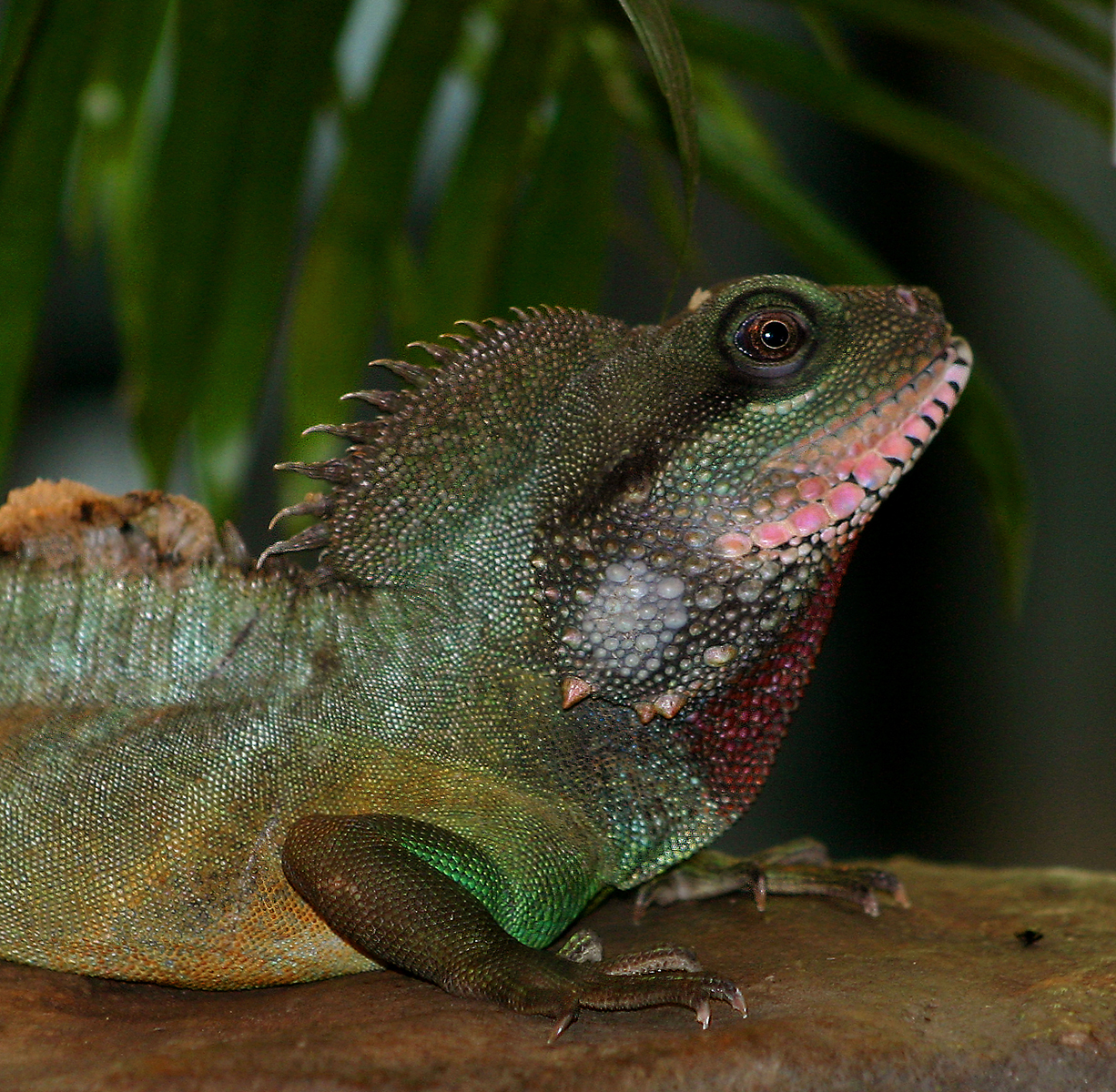
At Aalborg Zoo

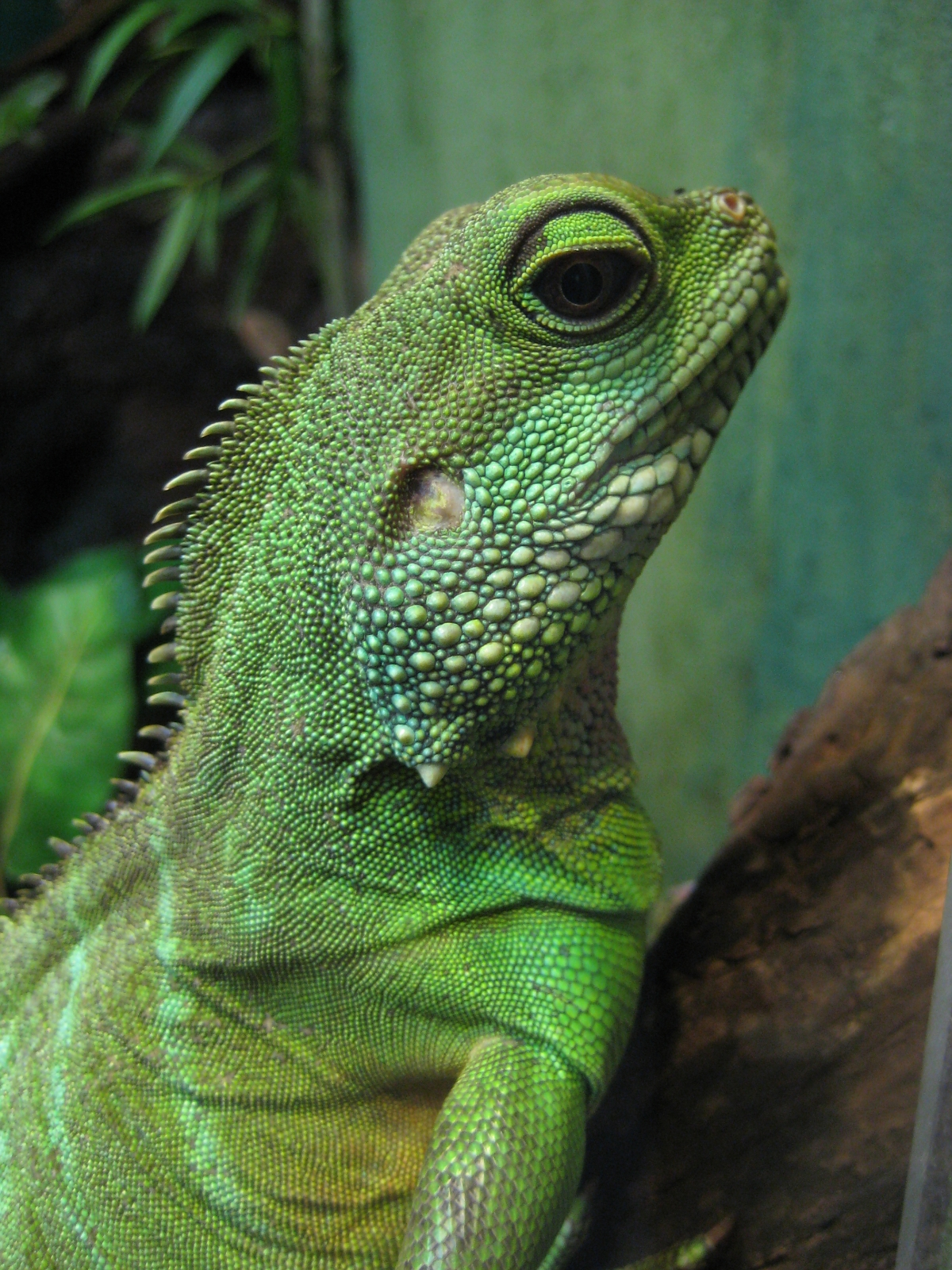
Detailed view of the head (Toronto Zoo)
