= Seka =

Seka may refer to:

- Ben Seka, Anglican bishop
- Monique Séka, Ivorian singer
- Seka (actress), an American pornographic actress
- Seka Aleksić, a Bosnian and Serbian singer
- Şekä, a dwarf in Tatar mythology
- SEKA (oil company), a petroleum bunkering company
- Seka District, a district (amphoe) in Bueng Kan Province, Thailand
  - Seka, Thailand, subdistrict in Seka District
- Seka, Ethiopia
- Seka or Hsekiu, Predynastic ancient Egyptian king
