= Sukumari Sekhar =

Malaysian women's and children's rights activist

Puan Sri Sukumari Sekhar (2 August 1933 – 8 March 2021) was a Malaysian women's and children's rights activist. She was the founder and deputy president of Malaysia's National Council of Women's Organizations.

== Early life and education ==
Sukumari Nair was born on 2 August 1933 in Jalan Bandar Hilir, Malacca. She was educated at the University of Malaya in Singapore.

== Women's and children's rights activism ==
Sekhar was one of the founders and a former deputy president of the National Council of Women's Organizations, Malaysia. From 1967 to 1972, she served as the organisation's honorary assistant secretary-general and from 1972 to 1979 as the honorary secretary-general. In May 1977, she chaired the organising committee at the National Education Conference on the Prevention of Drug Abuse.

Sekhar advocated on behalf of children's rights in Malaysia, petitioning the government to recognise the inheritance and proprietary rights of children born out of wedlock. In 1978, Sekhar organised several workshops around the rights of children in preparation for the following year's International Year of the Child. At one of the seven workshops, the rights of children born out of wedlock were discussed. The workshop recommended changing legislation around illegitimacy, producing a memorandum and a Children's Charter. In the 1990s, Sekhar represented Malaysia at the Year of the Child Conference in Nairobi.

Following the 2001 Kampung Medan riots, Sekhar proposed a foundation that could provide skill training for the youth. The MySkills Foundation was established in 2011. Sekhar was chair of the Women Teachers' Union's Selangor branch. She was the recipient of the Anugerah Tokoh Wanita Award in 2012.

== Personal life ==
Sukumari married businessman B. C. Shekhar. After he received the honour of Commander of the Order of Loyalty to the Crown of Malaysia in 1976, she received the title Puan Sri. She is the mother of Jayan, Sujatha, Vinod, and Gopinath.

Sekhar died on 8 March 2021 at the Cardiac Vascular Sentral Kuala Lumpur.
