= Nong Thum =

Nong Thum หนองทุ่ม
- Tambon
- Interactive map of Nong Thum
- Coordinates: 17°53′33″N 103°51′59″E
- Country: Thailand
- Province: Bueng Kan
- Amphoe: Seka

Population (2020)
  - Total: 7,118
- Time zone: UTC+7 (TST)
- Postal code: 38150
- TIS 1099: 380408

Nong Thum (Thai: หนองทุ่ม) is a tambon (subdistrict) of Seka District, in Bueng Kan Province, Thailand. In 2020 it had a total population of 7,118 people.

== History ==
The subdistrict was created effective June 8, 1987 by splitting off 8 administrative villages from Sang.

== Administration ==
=== Central administration ===
The tambon is subdivided into 13 administrative villages (muban).

No.	Name	Thai
1.	Ban Nong Thum	บ้านหนองทุ่ม
2.	Ban Bueng Kheng	บ้านบึงเค็ง
3.	Ban Lao Suan Kluai	บ้านเหล่าสวนกล้วย
4.	Ban Dong Tok Paen	บ้านดงตอกแป้น
5.	Ban Khok Kong	บ้านโคกก่อง
6.	Ban Nong Chik	บ้านหนองจิก
7.	Ban Kut Sim	บ้านกุดสิม
8.	Ban Lao	บ้านเหล่า
9.	Ban Tha Khaen Ngan	บ้านท่าแคนงาน
10.	Ban Mongkhon Phatthana	บ้านมงคลพัฒนา
11.	Ban Piyachon	บ้านปิยชน
12.	Ban Nong Thum Tai	บ้านหนองทุ่มใต้
13.	Ban Kut Sim Nuea	บ้านกุดสิมเหนือ

=== Local administration ===
The whole area of the subdistrict is covered by the subdistrict administrative organization (SAO) Nong Thum (องค์การบริหารส่วนตำบลหนองทุ่ม).
