= Shekhar =

Shekhar is an Indian male given name (also used as a surname). It may refer to:

== People ==
=== First name ===
- Shekhar Chatterjee (born 1924), Indian actor and director
- Shekhar Chaudhuri, Indian management professor
- Shekhar Dutt (1945–2025), Indian politician
- Shekhar Gawli (1975–2020), Indian cricketer
- Shekhar Gupta (born 1957), Indian journalist
- Shekhar Gurera (born 1965), Indian cartoonist
- Shekhar Joshi (1932–2022), Indian author
- Shekhar Kapur (born 1945), Indian film director, producer and actor
- Shekhar C. Mande (born 1962), Indian scientist
- Shekhar Mehta (1945–2006), Kenyan rally driver
- Shekhar Pathak (born 1940s), Indian historian
- Shekhar Ravjiani, Indian musician
- Shekhar Sen (born 1961), Indian musician and actor
- Shekhar Suman (born 1962), Indian actor and television host

=== Surname ===
- Arjun Shekhar (born 1965), Indian entrepreneur and writer
- B. C. Shekhar (1929–2007), Malaysian businessman
- Chandra Shekhar Azad (1906–1931), Indian revolutionary
- Chandra Shekhar Singh (1927–2007), Indian politician and Prime Minister
- Mayank Shekhar (born 1980), Indian journalist
- Neeraj Shekhar (born 1968), Indian politician
- R. K. Shekhar (1933–1976), Indian composer
- Ranjit Shekhar Mooshahary (born 1946), Indian politician
- S. Ve. Shekher (born 1950), Indian playwright and actor
- Surya Shekhar Ganguly (born 1983), Indian chess grandmaster

== Other uses ==
- Shekar (film), 2022 Indian film
- Shekhar: Ek Jivani, Hindi-language novel by Indian writer Agyeya
- Simply Shekhar, Indian late-night talk show hosted by Shekhar Suman

== See also ==
- Sekar, alternate transliteration of the name
- Chandra Shekhar Singh ministry, the cabinet of the prime minister
