= Pong Hai =

Pong Hai ป่งไฮ
- Tambon
- Interactive map of Pong Hai
- Coordinates: 18°01′15″N 103°49′07″E
- Country: Thailand
- Province: Bueng Kan
- Amphoe: Seka

Population (2020)
  - Total: 10,497
- Time zone: UTC+7 (TST)
- Postal code: 38150
- TIS 1099: 380405

Pong Hai (Thai: ป่งไฮ) is a tambon (subdistrict) of Seka District, in Bueng Kan Province, Thailand. In 2020 it had a total population of 10,497 people.

== History ==
The subdistrict was created effective May 15, 1973 by splitting off 7 administrative villages from Tha Kok Daeng.

== Administration ==
=== Central administration ===
The tambon is subdivided into 18 administrative villages (muban).

No.	Name	Thai
1.	Ban Pong Hai	บ้านป่งไฮ
2.	Ban Tha Chiang Khruea	บ้านท่าเชียงเครือ
3.	Ban Nong Chaiwan	บ้านหนองชัยวาน
4.	Ban Khok Khong	บ้านโคกโขง
5.	Ban Tha Rai	บ้านท่าไร่
6.	Ban Non Nam Thaeng	บ้านโนนหนามแท่ง
7.	Ban Tha Sawan	บ้านท่าสวรรค์
8.	Ban Sangkhom Phatthana	บ้านสังคมพัฒนา
9.	Ban Don Ko	บ้านดอนก่อ
10.	Ban Chok Chai	บ้านโชคชัย
11.	Ban Tha Chang	บ้านท่าช้าง
12.	Ban Non Tapha	บ้านโนนตาผา
13.	Ban Nong Kaeng Sai	บ้านหนองแก่งทราย
14.	Ban Tha Chiang Khruea Tai	บ้านท่าเชียงเครือใต้
15.	Ban Nong Chaiwan Tai	บ้านหนองชัยวานใต้
16.	Ban Tha Sawan Nuea	บ้านท่าสวรรค์เหนือ
17.	Ban Nong Khai Nok	บ้านหนองไข่นก
18.	Ban Thung Charoen	บ้านทุ่งเจริญ

=== Local administration ===
The whole area of the subdistrict is covered by the subdistrict municipality (Thesaban Tambon) Pong Hai (เทศบาลตำบลป่งไฮ).
