= Sang, Bueng Kan =

Sang ซาง
- Tambon
- Interactive map of Sang
- Coordinates: 17°52′38″N 103°56′32″E
- Country: Thailand
- Province: Bueng Kan
- Amphoe: Seka

Population (2020)
  - Total: 8,883
- Time zone: UTC+7 (TST)
- Postal code: 38150
- TIS 1099: 380402

Sang (Thai: ซาง) is a tambon (subdistrict) of Seka District, in Bueng Kan Province, Thailand. In 2020 it had a total population of 8,883 people.

== Administration ==
=== Central administration ===
The tambon is subdivided into 13 administrative villages (muban).

No.	Name	Thai
1.	Ban Sang	บ้านซาง
2.	Ban Tha Samran	บ้านท่าสำราญ
3.	Ban Som Kok	บ้านซ่อมกอก
4.	Ban Khok Borikan	บ้านโคกบริการ
5.	Ban Nong Yang	บ้านหนองยาง
6.	Ban Dong San	บ้านดงสาร
7.	Ban San Kamphaeng	บ้านสันกำแพง
8.	Ban Tha Ruea	บ้านท่าเรือ
9.	Ban Sang Tai	บ้านซางใต้
10.	Ban Non Sa-nga	บ้านโนนสง่า
11.	Ban Som Kok Nuea	บ้านซ่อมกอกเหนือ
12.	Ban Tha Samran Nuea	บ้านท่าสำราญเหนือ
13.	Ban Sang Nuea	บ้านซางเหนือ

=== Local administration ===
The whole area of the subdistrict is covered by the subdistrict municipality (Thesaban Tambon) Sang (เทศบาลตำบลซาง).
