= Sekar =

Manokaris a male given name in India. Sekar may refer to:

- Sekar Ayu Asmara, Indonesian songwriter and director
- Sekar Ayyanthole (born 1954), Indian painter
- Sekhar Basu (born 1952), Indian scientist
- Sekhar Das (born 1954), Indian film director
- Sekhar Kammula (born 1972), Indian film director
- Sekhar Menon (born 1983), Indian actor
- Sekhar Tam Tam (born 1951), Grenadian doctor

== Other uses ==
- Sekar language of Indonesia
- Sekhar v. United States, 2013 US Supreme Court case
- Sekarabad, Iran

== See also ==
- Shekhar (disambiguation)
