= Sok Kam =

Sok Kam โสกก่าม
- Tambon
- Interactive map of Sok Kam
- Coordinates: 18°03′31″N 104°01′02″E
- Country: Thailand
- Province: Bueng Kan
- Amphoe: Seka

Population (2020)
  - Total: 6,304
- Time zone: UTC+7 (TST)
- Postal code: 38150
- TIS 1099: 380409

Sok Kam (Thai: โสกก่าม) is a tambon (subdistrict) of Seka District, in Bueng Kan Province, Thailand. In 2020 it had a total population of 6,304 people.

== History ==
The subdistrict was created effective August 10, 1989 by splitting off 7 administrative villages from Ban Tong.

== Administration ==
=== Central administration ===
The tambon is subdivided into 12 administrative villages (muban).

No.	Name	Thai
1.	Ban Sok Kam	บ้านโสกก่าม
2.	Ban Na Ta Kai	บ้านนาตาไก้
3.	Ban Yang Rian	บ้านยางเรียน
4.	Ban Nong Pa Tang	บ้านหนองปะต่าง
5.	Ban Bo Phana	บ้านบ่อพนา
6.	Ban Dong Sawang	บ้านดงสว่าง
7.	Ban Non Samran	บ้านโนนสำราญ
8.	Ban Nong Pla Duk	บ้านหนองปลาดุก
9.	Ban Tham Phra	บ้านถ้ำพระ
10.	Ban Non Samran Tai	บ้านโนนสำราญใต้
11.	Ban Non Ngam	บ้านโนนงาม
12.	Ban Charoen Suk	บ้านเจริญสุข

=== Local administration ===
The whole area of the subdistrict is covered by the subdistrict administrative organization (SAO) Sok Kam (องค์การบริหารส่วนตำบลโสกก่าม).
