= Vinod Sekhar =

Malaysian businessman

Yang Berbahagia Dato' Vinod Sekhar
- Born: 6 August 1968 (age 58); Kuala Lumpur, Malaysia
- Spouse: Datin Dr. Winy Sekhar

Vinod Sekhar (born 6 August 1968) is a Malaysian businessman who is the chairman and chief executive of the PETRA Group, whose businesses include restaurants, recycling rubber, media and entertainment, agriculture and modular building materials.

Sekhar is a proponent of social capitalism, a philosophy that combines business with the improvement of social capital. He has faced various legal controversies, including lawsuits from various entities.

He was named by Forbes magazine as Malaysia's 28th richest man in 2009.

== Education ==
He attended Haileybury and Imperial Service College

== Business career ==
In 1990, Sekhar formed Sekhar Tunku Imran (STI) Group together with his friend, Tunku Imran and entered various business ventures. One of the most notable business deals that STI had was a joint venture with Disney-MGM Studios in Florida, USA to produce the movie entitled 'Tarzan, The Epic Adventure'.

The Petra Group is a privately held company known for Green Rubber Global, the company's key business which it claims has a cost-effective process that can efficiently recycle used rubber.

In September 2020, Sekhar launched The Vibes, an online news publication covering Malaysian news.

In 2021, Petra Group announced that it had procured 200 thousand Sinovac COVID-19 vaccines from China for free distribution.

== Legal controversies ==
In June 2007, Vinod Sekhar paid a sum of RM657,428.18 to lawyer Affendi Zaharim who had sued him for breaching a settlement agreement over a share investment exercise. The payment was carried out to prevent his house being seized.

On Aug 7, 2019 court bailiffs raided his house in Bukit Tunku and allegedly seized valuables worth RM150,000. The action was carried out to fulfil a writ of seizure issued by the Kuala Lumpur Sessions Court which had awarded businessperson John Slattery US$108,000 (equivalent to about RM449,000) as a full settlement of a breach of contract suit against Sekhar.

In 2021, the Malaysian Anti-Corruption Commission opened a money laundering and tax evasion investigation into Sekhar's affairs.

In 2024 Sekhar and his wife Winny Yeap were sued by 12 investors and former employees, for alleged fraud, misrepresentation, breach of contract, and acknowledgement of debt. In the course of the trial, the High Court allowed an application by Prime Minister Anwar Ibrahim to set aside an order requiring him to appear as a subpoenaed witness. On June 25, 2026, the couple declined to take the stand in their trial, claiming they had no case to answer.

== Philanthropy ==
Sekhar is the founder of the Vinod Sekhar Foundation, which was founded to undertake various initiatives to alleviate poverty, provide healthcare and education, and support the most vulnerable communities including the indigenous, disabled, old folks, children, refugees, and poor.

Sekhar is a proponent of social capitalism, a system that interconnects profitability with the social good. He supports upcoming entrepreneurs whose business ideas embrace the system.

== Personal life ==
Sekhar is the youngest son of Sukumari Nair and B.C. Sekhar, also known as Mr. Natural Rubber, who, for a time, provided significant inputs in the global natural rubber industry. He has three siblings. He is married to Winy Sekhar with whom he has two daughters, Petra and Tara.

Sekhar claimed in a 2021 interview to be a "close friend" of Malaysian Prime Minister Anwar Ibrahim.

== Awards ==
In 2008, Grant Thornton awarded Sekhar the Malaysian Corporate Leader of the year. In 2024, Sekhar was awarded the Bhartiya Mahantam Vikas Puraskar 2023-24.
