= Nam Chan =

Coordinates: 18°02′N 103°52′E

Nam Chan น้ำจั้น
- Subdistrict
- Interactive map of Nam Chan
- Country: Thailand
- Province: Bueng Kan
- District: Seka

Population (2015)
  - Total: 6,418
- Time zone: UTC+7 (ICT)
- Postal code: 38150
- TIS 1099: 380406

Nam Chan (Thai: น้ำจั้น) is a tambon (sub-district) of Seka District, in Bueng Kan Province, Thailand. In 2015 it had a population of 6,418 persons.

== History ==
The subdistrict was created effective 1 May 1981, splitting off from Seka Sub-district.

== Administration ==
=== Central administration ===
The tambon is divided into 13 administrative villages (mubans).

No.	Name	Thai
1.	Ban Nam Chan	บ้านน้ำจั้น
2.	Ban Kham Bon	บ้านคำบอน
3.	Ban Tha Muang	บ้านท่าม่วง
4.	Ban Lao Kham	บ้านเหล่าคาม
5.	Ban Dong Kaphung	บ้านดงกะพุง
6.	Ban Nong Tan Phueak	บ้านหนองตันเผือก
7.	Ban Nong Khla	บ้านหนองคล่า
8.	Ban Nong Na Saeng	บ้านหนองนาแซง
9.	Ban Nong Pla Do	บ้านหนองปลาโด
10.	Ban Santi Phap	บ้านสันติภาพ
11.	Ban Kham Bon Tai	บ้านคำบอนใต้
12.	Ban Tha Muang Tai	บ้านท่าม่วงใต้
13.	Ban Kham Bon Mai	บ้านคำบอนใหม่

=== Local administration ===
The sub-district is governed by the sub-district administrative organization (SAO) Nam Chan (องค์การบริหารส่วนตำบลน้ำจั้น).
