= Tha Sa-at =

Tha Sa-at ท่าสะอาด
- Subdistrict
- Interactive map of Tha Sa-at
- Country: Thailand
- Province: Bueng Kan
- District: Seka District

Population (2010)
  - Total: 9,526
- Time zone: UTC+7 (ICT)
- Postal code: 38150
- TIS 1099: 380407

Tha Sa-at is a sub-district (tambon) in Seka District, in Bueng Kan Province, northeastern Thailand. As of 2010, it had a population of 9,526 people, with jurisdiction over 13 villages.
