= Seka subdistrict =

Seka เซกา
- Tambon
- Interactive map of Seka
- Coordinates: 17°55′41″N 103°56′33″E
- Country: Thailand
- Province: Bueng Kan
- Amphoe: Seka

Population (2020)
  - Total: 19,001
- Time zone: UTC+7 (TST)
- Postal code: 38150
- TIS 1099: 380401

Seka (Thai: เซกา) is situated in the tambon (subdistrict) of Seka District, in Bueng Kan Province, Thailand. In 2020 it had a total population of 19,001 people.

== Geography ==
It is the seat of the district. It lies in the southeastern part of the province, near the border with Sakon Nakhon Province. It lies along Thailand Route 2026.

== Administration ==
=== Central administration ===
The tambon is subdivided into 23 administrative villages (muban).

No.	Name	Thai
1.	Ban Seka Klang	บ้านเซกากลาง
2.	Ban Huai Khom	บ้านห้วยคอม
3.	Ban Non Sung	บ้านโนนสูง
4.	Ban Huai Phak Kha	บ้านห้วยผักขะ
5.	Ban Na Ngua	บ้านนางัว
6.	Ban Non Mueat Ae	บ้านโนนเหมือดแอ่
7.	Ban Si Phana	บ้านศรีพนา
8.	Ban Sai Panya	บ้านสายปัญญา
9.	Ban Huai Ruea	บ้านห้วยเรือ
10.	Ban Seka Tai	บ้านเซกาใต้
11.	Ban Dong Rai	บ้านดงไร่
12.	Ban Suk Sombun	บ้านสุขสมบูรณ์
13.	Ban Thai Seri	บ้านไทยเสรี
14.	Ban Seka Nuea	บ้านเซกาเหนือ
15.	Ban Khok Phithak	บ้านโคกพิทักษ์
16.	Ban Si Phana Nuea	บ้านศรีพนาเหนือ
17.	Ban Sap Wang Thong	บ้านทรัพย์วังทอง
18.	Ban Phatthana Phiban	บ้านพัฒนาภิบาล
19.	Ban Sai Panya Nuea	บ้านสายปัญญาเหนือ
20.	Ban Thepphamongkhon	บ้านเทพมงคล
21.	Ban Non Sung Nuea	บ้านโนนสูงเหนือ
22.	Ban Huai Phak Kha Nuea	บ้านห้วยผักขะเหนือ
23.	Ban Udom Sap	บ้านอุดมทรัพย์

=== Local administration ===
The area of the subdistrict is shared by 2 local governments.

- the subdistrict municipality (Thesaban Tambon) Si Phana (เทศบาลตำบลศรีพนา)
- the subdistrict administrative organization (SAO) Seka (องค์การบริหารส่วนตำบลเซกา)
