= Children's rights in Malaysia =

Children's rights in Malaysia have progressed since Malaysia acceded to the Convention on the Rights of the Child (CRC) in 1995 and introduced the Child Act in 2001.

Government and civil society initiatives to realise and uphold the rights of children has resulted in progress in the field of education and primary healthcare for children.

However, key challenges remain, particularly for marginalized and disadvantaged groups of children in the country. The Government of Malaysia’s reservations to five Articles of the Convention on the Rights of the Child (Articles 2, 7, 14, 28(a)(1) and 37) suggest that it takes the view that children can be discriminated against, have no right to a name or nationality, have no freedom of thought, conscience and religion, and should not be free from torture and deprivation of liberty.

== Convention on the Rights of the Child ==
In 1995, the Government of Malaysia ratified the United Nations Convention on the Rights of the Child (CRC), an international human rights treaty which upholds the civil, political, economic, social, health and cultural rights of all minors below 18 years. Adopted by the United Nations General Assembly on 20 November 1989, the CRC is based on four core principles, namely the principle of non discrimination, the best interests of the child, the right to life, survival and development, and considering the views of the child in decisions which affect them (according to their age and maturity).

=== CRC Optional Protocols ===
The Government of Malaysia ratified the CRC Optional Protocol on the Sale of Children, Child Prostitution and Child Pornography and the Optional Protocol on the Involvement of Children in Armed Conflict in 2012. Malaysia has not acceded to the CRC’s third Optional Protocol, adopted by the United Nations in 2011, relating to communication of complaints.

=== CRC Reservations ===
The Government of Malaysia’s ratification of the CRC contains a number of conditions in the form of ‘reservations’, which allow the Government to disagree with a provision in the CRC. Malaysia has five reservations currently, namely to:

- Article 2 on non-discrimination
- Article 7 on name and nationality
- Article 14 on freedom of thought, conscience and religion
- Article 28(1)(a) on free and compulsory education at primary level
- Article 37 on torture and deprivation of liberty

The Government expressed these reservations on the grounds that the CRC Articles were said to "not conform with the Constitution, national laws and national policies of the Government of Malaysia, including the Syariah law."

In 2010, the Government of Malaysia withdrew three earlier reservations to the CRC, namely Article 1 (definition of the child), Article 13 (freedom of expression) and Article 15 (freedom of assembly and participation).

=== CRC Reporting ===
National governments that ratify the CRC and its Optional Protocols must report to the Committee on the Rights of the Child, the body of experts charged with monitoring a country's implementation of these human rights treaties. These government reports must outline the situation of children in the country and explain the measures taken to realise and protect their rights.

The First Report from the Government of Malaysia to the Committee on the Rights of the Child was submitted in 2006, which was nine years overdue. The second report was due by 19 March 2012.

=== CRC Committee Concluding Observations ===
In 2007, the Committee on the Rights of the Child submitted its Concluding Observations to the Government of Malaysia following the country's submission of its first CRC report. The Concluding Observations included the following recommendations:

- Review and abolish Malaysia's reservations to the CRC
- Review Malaysia's dual legal system (Civil and Syariah) as some domestic laws are obstacles to the realisation of the CRC in Malaysia
- Establish a systematic assessment of the impact of budgetary allocations on the implementation of the rights of the child
- Improve the birth registration system of non-Malaysian children born in Malaysia, children of single mothers and children born in remote areas of the country.
- Ensure that all children have equal access to quality education at all levels and that their access to education is not impeded by economic shortcomings;
- Collect adequate statistical data on children with disabilities and ensure the use of such data in the development of policies and programmes for these children;
- Abolish capital punishment for children
- Review the Children and Young Persons (Employment) Act 1966 to ensure that acceptable conditions of work are clearly and strictly defined to comply with international labour standards.

== Legal Framework ==
Malaysia has a legislative, administrative and policy framework to cater for the protection and needs of children and the promotion of their physical, mental, intellectual and emotional development.

The Federal Constitution sets out the basic human rights standards, which also extend to children. These include liberty of the person (Article 5); prohibition of slavery and forced labour (Article 6); and rights in respect of education (Article 12).

Malaysia enacted the Child Act 2001 [Act 611] to fulfil its obligation under the Convention on the Rights of the Child (CRC).

=== Child Act 2001 ===
The Child Act 2001 (Act 611) is the country's legislation for the protection, care and rehabilitation of children. This Act incorporates the core principles of non-discrimination, best interests of the child, the right to life, survival and development as well as respect for the views of the child.

Act 611 repealed the Juvenile Courts Act 1947 [Act 90], the Women and Girls Protection Act 1973 [Act 106] and the Child Protection Act 1991 [Act 468].

In 2001, the Act established the National Council for the Protection of Children, which advises the Government on child protection issues while the National Advisory and Consultative Council for Children acts as a national focal point for children's wellbeing and development. Act 611 also requires the setting up of Child Protection Teams and Child Activity Centres at both state and district levels for children at risk or children vulnerable to all forms of abuse and exploitation.

In terms of administration of juvenile justice, Act 611 provides for a procedure before the Court for Children, which is child-friendly taking into account the mental and emotional maturity of a child.

=== Other laws ===
Other child-related legislation in Malaysia include the Adoption Act 1952, Anti-Trafficking in Persons Act 2007, Child Care Centres Act 1984, Children and Young Persons (Employment) Act 1966; Domestic Violence Act 1994, Education Act 1996 and the Islamic Family Law (Federal Territory) Act 1984 (“IFLA”) [Act 303].

== Progress ==
The principles of the Convention on the Rights of the Child have helped influence Malaysia's efforts to reduce the number of children dying before the age of five, accelerate girls’ education, and increase access to education for children living in remote parts of the country. Primary school education was made compulsory in 2002 to ensure increased school enrolment and completion.

The Child Act 2001 (Act 611) has introduced several initiatives to safeguard children from violence, abuse, neglect and exploitation. Incest has been criminalised by the Penal Code (Act 574), while the Domestic Violence Act 1994 (Act 521) protects the child against violence within the family.

The Anti-Trafficking in Persons Act came into force on 28 February 2008 and provides, among others, the legal mechanism to criminalise human trafficking and providing care, protection and shelter for the victims. At the international level, Malaysia has signed the United Nations Convention Against Transnational Organised Crime (UNTOC) in 2002 and ratified it in 2004. Malaysia is currently in the process of acceding to the Protocol to Prevent, Suppress and Punish Trafficking in Persons especially Women and Children, supplementing UNTOC.

== Issues of Concern ==
Despite lifting the reservation to Article 1, inconsistencies in the definition of the child under national laws remain, with multiple, contradictory definitions of the child under both civil and Sharia law. There has yet to be a shift from needs-based to rights-based policies and programs for children in Malaysia. Approaches towards children are generally paternalistic and their views are generally not sought or given due weight in decisions that affect them.

=== Undocumented Children ===
Although birth registration is a fundamental right of every child, it is estimated that there are 50,000 undocumented children in Malaysia. They include children from the rural poor and indigenous communities in remote locations, particularly in Sabah and Sarawak as well as children of irregular migrants and refugees.

Malaysia does not grant citizenship by birth, choosing not to adhere to the principle of jus soli. Individuals can only apply for citizenship if one parent is a citizen of Malaysia. Migrants must produce each parent's passport and a certificate of marriage, documents which many do not possess, if they wish to obtain a birth certificate in Malaysia. In addition, those who work in rural areas are sometimes not able to travel to the national registration authority to apply for the birth certificate. The fear of arrest and detention, and the restrictions on the ability of some migrant workers to marry, has meant that many refugees, asylum-seeking and irregular migrants do not apply for birth certificates for their children.

Children without a birth certificate can be denied access to healthcare and other basic social services which expose them to exploitation and poor health. They are unable to enroll in Government schools or to participate in examinations. For Malaysian children, a lack of a birth certificate can also affect their chances of applying for a MyKad when they reach 12 years of age.

=== Out-of-School Children ===
Although the Education Amendment Act 2002 has made primary education compulsory for all children from aged 6, this requirement is not enforced. There are an estimated 200,000 children of primary-school age in Malaysia who are not attending school. Cost of schooling is one of the obstacles for children from low-income families. Education is also not sufficient for children with disabilities; children (of Malaysians) without birth certificates are denied the opportunity to attend schools; and asylum seeking children, refugee children, stateless children as well as children of migrant workers are not given free primary education in government-run schools.

=== Child Marriage ===
Malaysia's Population and Housing Census in 2010 showed that 82,282 married women in Malaysia were girls between the ages of 15 and 19, while another 1,000 in this age group were widowed and 842 separated or divorced. The Deputy Minister for Women revealed that, for that same year, nearly 16,000 girls below the age of 15 were in a marriage.

Malaysia has a dual legal system, which means that the minimum age of marriage can be determined by either civil law or Syaria (Islamic) law. Non-Muslims may only marry from the age of 18, but girls can be married as early as 16 provided they or their parents have the permission of the State Chief Minister. The minimum age of marriage is 16 for Muslim girls and 18 for Muslim boys. Crucially, exceptions can be made for girls or boys to marry at a much younger age as long as they obtain Islamic courts’ consent.

Factors that lead to early marriage in Malaysia are pregnancies before marriage and parents’ decision to avoid their children's involvement in deteriorating moral problems.

== See also ==
- Human rights in Malaysia
