= Seka district =

Seka เซกา
- District
- District location in Bueng Kan province
- Coordinates: 17°55′42″N 103°57′12″E
- Country: Thailand
- Province: Bueng Kan
- Seat: Seka
- Subdistricts: 9
- Mubans: 131
- District established: 1958

Area
  - Total: 978.428 km^{2} (377.773 sq mi)

Population (2015)
  - Total: 86,087
  - Density: 82.3/km^{2} (213/sq mi)
- Time zone: UTC+7 (ICT)
- Postal code: 38150
- Geocode: 3804

Seka (Thai: เซกา, pronounced [sēːkāː]) is a district (amphoe) in the eastern part of Bueng Kan province, northeastern Thailand.

== Geography ==
Neighboring districts are (from the west clockwise) Phon Charoen, Si Wilai, Mueang Bueng Kan, Bung Khla, and Bueng Khong Long of Bueng Kan Province, Na Thom of Nakhon Phanom province, Akat Amnuai, Kham Ta Kla, and Ban Muang of Sakon Nakhon province.

The main river of the district is the Songkhram River. The Phu Wua Wildlife Sanctuary is in the district.

== History ==
The minor district Seka was established on 16 November 1958, when the five sub-districts, Seka, Dong Bang, Sang, Pho Mak Khaeng, and Tha Kok Daeng were split off from Bueng Kan district. The following year it was upgraded to a full district.

== Administration ==
=== Central administration ===
Seka is divided into nine sub-districts (tambons), which are further subdivided into 136 administrative villages (mubans).

No.	Name	Thai	Villages	Pop.
1.	Seka	เซกา	23	19,113
2.	Sang	ซาง	13	8,774
3.	Tha Kok Daeng	ท่ากกแดง	16	7,080
4.	Ban Tong	บ้านต้อง	15	11,138
5.	Pong Hai	ป่งไฮ	18	10,417
6.	Nam Chan	น้ำจั้น	13	6,418
7.	Tha Sa-at	ท่าสะอาด	13	9,835
8.	Nong Thum	หนองทุ่ม	13	7,053
9.	Sok Kam	โสกก่าม	12	6,259

Missing numbers refer to subdistricts split off to form Bueng Khong Long district.

=== Local administration ===
There are three sub-district municipalities (Thesaban Tambons) in the district:

- Tha Sa-at (Thai: เทศบาลตำบลท่าสะอาด) consisting of parts of sub-district Tha Sa-at.
- Si Phana (Thai: เทศบาลตำบลศรีพนา) consisting of parts of sub-district Seka.
- Sang (Thai: เทศบาลตำบลซาง) consisting of sub-district Sang.

There are eight sub-district administrative organizations (SAO) in the district:

- Seka (Thai: องค์การบริหารส่วนตำบลเซกา) consisting of parts of sub-district Seka.
- Tha Kok Daeng (Thai: องค์การบริหารส่วนตำบลท่ากกแดง) consisting of sub-district Tha Kok Daeng.
- Ban Tong (Thai: องค์การบริหารส่วนตำบลบ้านต้อง) consisting of sub-district Ban Tong.
- Pong Hai (Thai: องค์การบริหารส่วนตำบลป่งไฮ) consisting of sub-district Pong Hai.
- Nam Chan (Thai: องค์การบริหารส่วนตำบลน้ำจั้น) consisting of sub-district Nam Chan.
- Tha Sa-at (Thai: องค์การบริหารส่วนตำบลท่าสะอาด) consisting of parts of sub-district Tha Sa-at.
- Nong Thum (Thai: องค์การบริหารส่วนตำบลหนองทุ่ม) consisting of sub-district Nong Thum.
- Sok Kam (Thai: องค์การบริหารส่วนตำบลโสกก่าม) consisting of sub-district Sok Kam.
