= Sekhar Tam Tam =

Indian medical doctor

Sekhar Tam Tam was awarded the MBE (Member of the Order of the British Empire) by Queen Elizabeth II at an investiture ceremony held at Buckingham Palace on 6 December 2006. The award was given for Tam Tam's contribution to health and public service in the British Caribbean island of Grenada.

== Early life and education ==
Tam Tam was born in 1951 to a family of agricultural land owners in Dachepalli in Guntur district, Andhra Pradesh, India. He was inspired to become a doctor by his grandfather, who was a practitioner of ayurvedic medicine. In 1967, Tam Tam passed the matriculation exams of Andhra University. He was later awarded a gold medal in literature in the Pre-university exams at KBN College in Vijayawada in 1968. After graduating from Kurnool Medical College in 1976, Tam Tam joined the rural health service in South India. In 1979, he served at the Kingston Public Hospital in Jamaica before joining the health service in Grenada.

== Career and community service ==
Tam Tam has been in Grenada's public service for the past 26 years. He was employed by the Ministry of Health in 1980 as a casualty medical officer at the General Hospital in St. George's. In 1981 he was promoted to the post of District Medical Officer and he continues to serve in this capacity. As a District Medical Officer, his roles in the community included that of a family physician and an advocate of public health. Tam Tam has served in four parishes of Grenada including St. George, St. Mark, St. John and St. Andrew. He was a member of several medical boards and currently serves on the Grenada Pharmacy Council. He is also a clinical instructor at the St. George's University School of Medicine.

== Personal life ==
Tam Tam married Akhilandeswari Pasupuleti in 1973. They have two children, both of whom are Obstetricians & Gynecologists in the United States.
