= B. C. Shekhar =

Malaysian rubber and palm oil businessman (1929 - 2006)

Balachandra Chakkingal Sekhar (17 November 1929 – 6 September 2006) was a Malaysian businessman, who revolutionized country's natural rubber industry, and played a significant role in the development of its palm oil industry.

== Personal history ==
Sekhar was born on 17 November 1929 at the Ulu Bulu Estate (now Malayan Glass). His place of birth is located near the Rubber Research Institute of Malaysia's (RRIM) 3,400-acre experimental station at Sungai Buloh, which he developed during his tenure into one of the most comprehensively equipped research centers.

He started as a chemist at RRIM in 1949, focusing on research into the physiochemical changes in natural rubber. He turned the institute into a research center able to conduct in-depth research into the manufacture of rubber applications from tubes, tires, gloves, and even earthquake disaster prevention devices.

== Contributions ==
=== Rubber ===
Sekhar served the natural rubber industry for about 50 years in various capacities. He was the Asian Director of the Rubber Research Institute of Malaysia in 1966 and, subsequently, became the first Asian Controller of Rubber Research and chairman of the Malaysian Rubber Research and Development Board.

Under his leadership, the RRIM, Tun Abdul Razak Rubber Research Centre (TARRC) in Hertford, Britain, and the Malaysian Rubber Board (MRB) gained international recognition for its contributions to research, modernization of the rubber industry and the promotion and expansion of rubber usage.

He was actively involved in the formation of the Malaysian Agriculture Research and Development Institute and evolved the Malaysian Rubber Development Corporation from a desk in his division to what it finally became.

His efforts in setting up central processing units throughout the country and spearheading smallholder support and development systems lead to improved levels of performance and viability while contributing substantively to the nation's economy.

Sekhar also oversaw the development of stimulants to paint on rubber trees to double and in many cases triple latex yields. He was directly involved in the invention and subsequent development of the Standard Malaysian Rubber (SMR) process whose final product allowed for grading to buyers' specifications to a very high level of consistency. This was one of its most significant developments as an industrial raw material.

On the international front, Dr. Sekhar, in his capacity as chairman of the International Rubber Research and Development Board, was instrumental in converting the organization into a dynamic institution. The membership increased threefold under his leadership.

The IRRDB successfully implemented the expedition into Brazil for the collection of new germplasm. The organization also established an international R&D program, three parts of which were financed through UNIDO Member institutes.

Dr. Sekhar travelled widely and attended conferences around the world. He promoted the use of natural rubber and became recognized within the international elastomer industry.

With numerous patents to his name some of his more recent innovations were in the areas of rubber recycling (Delink), low-protein latex and rubberized textiles.

=== Palm Oil ===
He was also instrumental in setting up the Palm Oil Research Institute of Malaysia and was its founder and chairman. Sekhar established PORIM as one of the premier centers for oils and fats research in the world.

=== Plantation Workers ===
Sekhar was a tireless champion for the rights of Malaysian plantation workers and their progeny, mostly ethnic Indians, and made it an important part of his life's work to make sure that they received a monthly wage and due recognition from the government for their contributions to the economy of the nation.

== Awards and recognitions ==
As one of Asia's most effective scientists, Sekhar received the 1973 Ramon Magsaysay Award for Government Service and many other awards, local and international, for his efforts.

The Yang di-Pertuan Agong (King) and Government of Malaysia, in recognition of his excellent service to the nation, bestowed upon him the title of 'Tan Sri'.

A Biography has been released of Tan Sri Sekhar by The Academy of Sciences Malaysia.

=== Honours of Malaysia ===
- Malaysia
  - Companion of the Order of Loyalty to the Crown of Malaysia (JSM) (1969)
  - Commander of the Order of Loyalty to the Crown of Malaysia (PSM) – Tan Sri (1976)

== Family ==
Sekhar was married to Puan Sri Sukumari Sekhar. He had four children and 8 grandchildren.

== Death ==
Tan Sri B.C Sekhar died of a heart attack on 6 September 2006 at the Kaliappa Hospital in Raja Annamlaipuram, Chennai, India at 9am (5am India time). He was 77. His remains were cremated at the Cheris crematorium in Malaysia.
