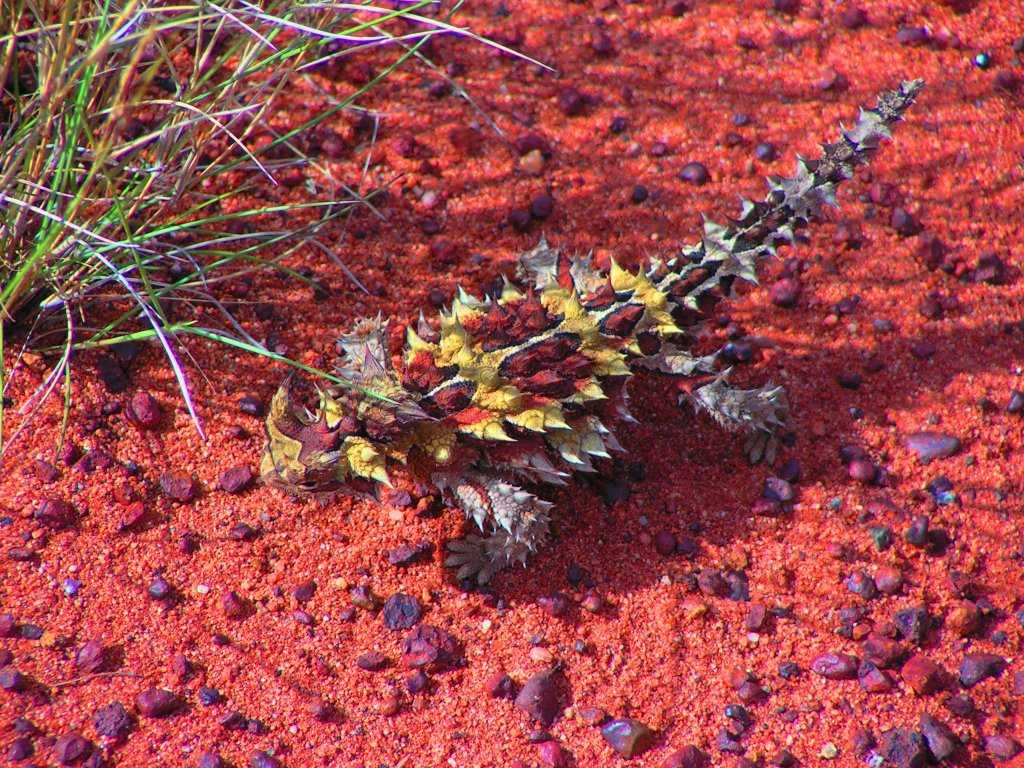
- Thorny devil (Moloch horridus)

Scientific classification
- Domain: Eukaryota
- Kingdom: Animalia
- Phylum: Chordata
- Class: Reptilia
- Order: Squamata
- Suborder: Iguania
- Family: Agamidae
- Subfamily: Amphibolurinae; Wagler, 1830

Genera
- See text

= Amphibolurinae =

Subfamily of lizards

The Amphibolurinae are a subfamily of lizards in the family Agamidae. Members of this subfamily are found in Australia and New Guinea, although one species, the Chinese water dragon, is found in Southeast Asia.

== Genera ==
Genera within the subfamily Amphibolurinae usually dwell in flat, sandy habitats. This subfamily includes:

Genus	Species	Example
Amphibolurus (lashtail dragons)	4	Jacky dragon (A. muricatus)
Chelosania (ring-tailed dragon)	1	
Chlamydosaurus (frilled-neck lizard)	1	Frilled dragon (C. kingii)
Cryptagama (gravel dragon)	1	
Ctenophorus (comb-bearing dragons)	34	Crested bicycle dragon (C. cristatus)
Diporiphora (two-lined dragons)	28	Tommy roundhead (D. australis)
Gowidon (long-snouted lashtail, long-nosed water dragon)	1	Long-snouted lashtail (G. longirostris)
Hypsilurus (rainforest dragons)	18	H. auritus
Intellagama (Australian water dragon)	1	Australian water dragon (I. lesueurii)
Lophognathus	2	Gilbert's lashtail (L. gilberti)
Lophosaurus (forest dragons)	3	Boyd's forest dragon (L. boydii)
Moloch (thorny devil)	1	Thorny devil (M. horridus)
Physignathus (Chinese water dragon)	1	Chinese water dragon (P. cocincinus)
Pogona (bearded dragons)	6	Central bearded dragon (P. vitticeps)
Rankinia (heath dragon)	1	Mountain heath dragon (R. diemensis)
Tropicagama (swamplands lashtail, northern water dragon)	1	Swamplands lashtail (T. temporalis)
Tympanocryptis (earless dragons)	23	Eyrean earless dragon (T. tetraporophora)
