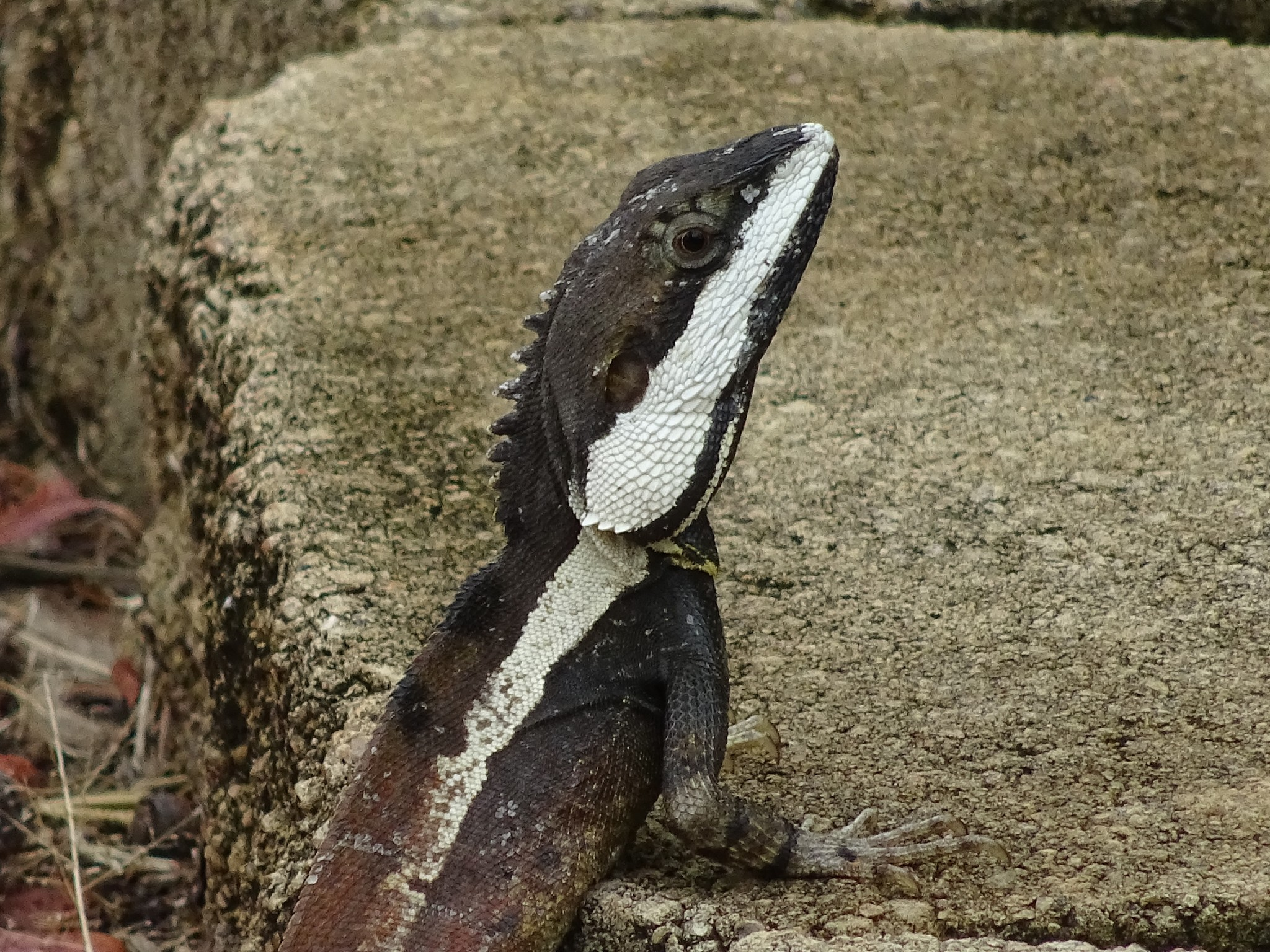
- In Kakadu National Park

Conservation status
- Least Concern (IUCN 3.1)

Scientific classification
- Kingdom: Animalia
- Phylum: Chordata
- Class: Reptilia
- Order: Squamata
- Suborder: Iguania
- Family: Agamidae
- Subfamily: Amphibolurinae
- Genus: Tropicagama; Melville, Ritchie, Chapple, Glor, & Schulte, 2018
- Species: T. temporalis

Binomial name
- Tropicagama temporalis (Günther, 1867)

Synonyms
- List: Gowidon temporalis (Günther, 1867); Grammatophora temporalis (Günther, 1867); Lophognathus lateralis (Macleay, 1877); Lophognathus labialis (Boulenger, 1883); Lophognathus maculilabris (Boulenger, 1883); Physignathus temporalis (Boulenger, 1883); Gemmatophora temporalis (Storr, 1983); Lophognathus temporalis (Cogger, 1983); Amphibolurus temporalis (Ehmann, 1992); Tropicagama temporalis (Melville et al., 2018)

= Tropicagama =

Genus of lizards

Tropicagama is a genus of large-bodied lizards in the family Agamidae. The genus is monotypic, with only one species listed: Tropicagama temporalis, commonly known as the swamplands lashtail or northern water dragon. This semi-arboreal species inhabits the tropical savannah woodlands of northern Australia, as well as parts of New Guinea and southeastern Indonesia.

== Taxonomy ==
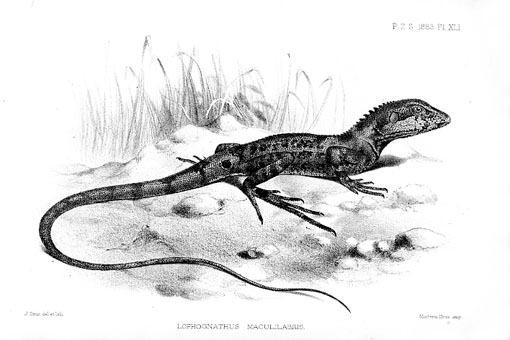
1883 illustration by Joseph Smit. The species was classified at that time as Lophognathus maculilabris

From its original description in 1867 until 2017, genus Tropicagama has previously been included in multiple other genera, including Amphibolurus, Gemmatophora, Gowidon, Grammatophora, Lophognathus, and Physignathus. The new genus – Tropicagama – was created by Melville et al. in 2018, after an extensive analysis of three genera (Amphibolurus, Gowidon and Lophognathus) that have had long-standing inconsistencies in their taxonomic classification. The morphological and mitochondrial DNA analysis revealed that four distinct evolutionary lines were lumped in the former genus Lophognathus. As a result, the former genus Lophognathus has now been split into genera Amphibolurus, Gowidon, Lophognathus, and Tropicagama. All of these genera are contained within subfamily Amphibolurinae.

== Phylogeny and biogeography ==
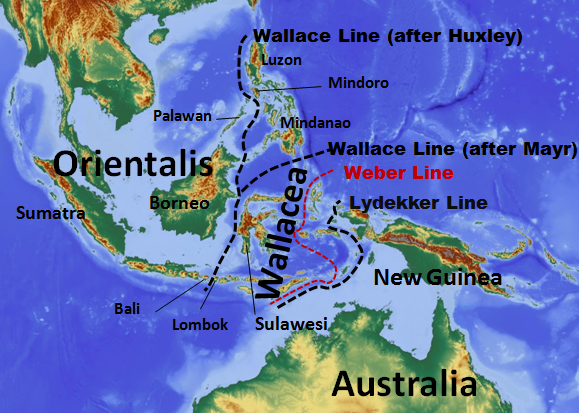
A map of Wallacea, bordered by the Wallace Line on the west and Lydekker's Line on the east

Sequencing and analysis of mitochondrial DNA, along with phylogenetic and divergence time analyses, reveals that the genus Tropicagama originated in the late Miocene and early Pliocene epoch. T. temporalis migrated from Australia to New Guinea during the Pliocene epoch, sometime between 2.3 and 4.7 million years ago (Ma). It then migrated from New Guinea across Lydekker's Line into Wallacea less than 1 Ma, during the mid-Pleistocene epoch. Wallacea is a zone of mixing between fauna of the Indomalayan and Australasian ecozones. The eastern border of this zone is represented by a zoogeographical boundary known as Lydekker's Line, while the Wallace Line defines the western border.

== Distribution and habitat ==
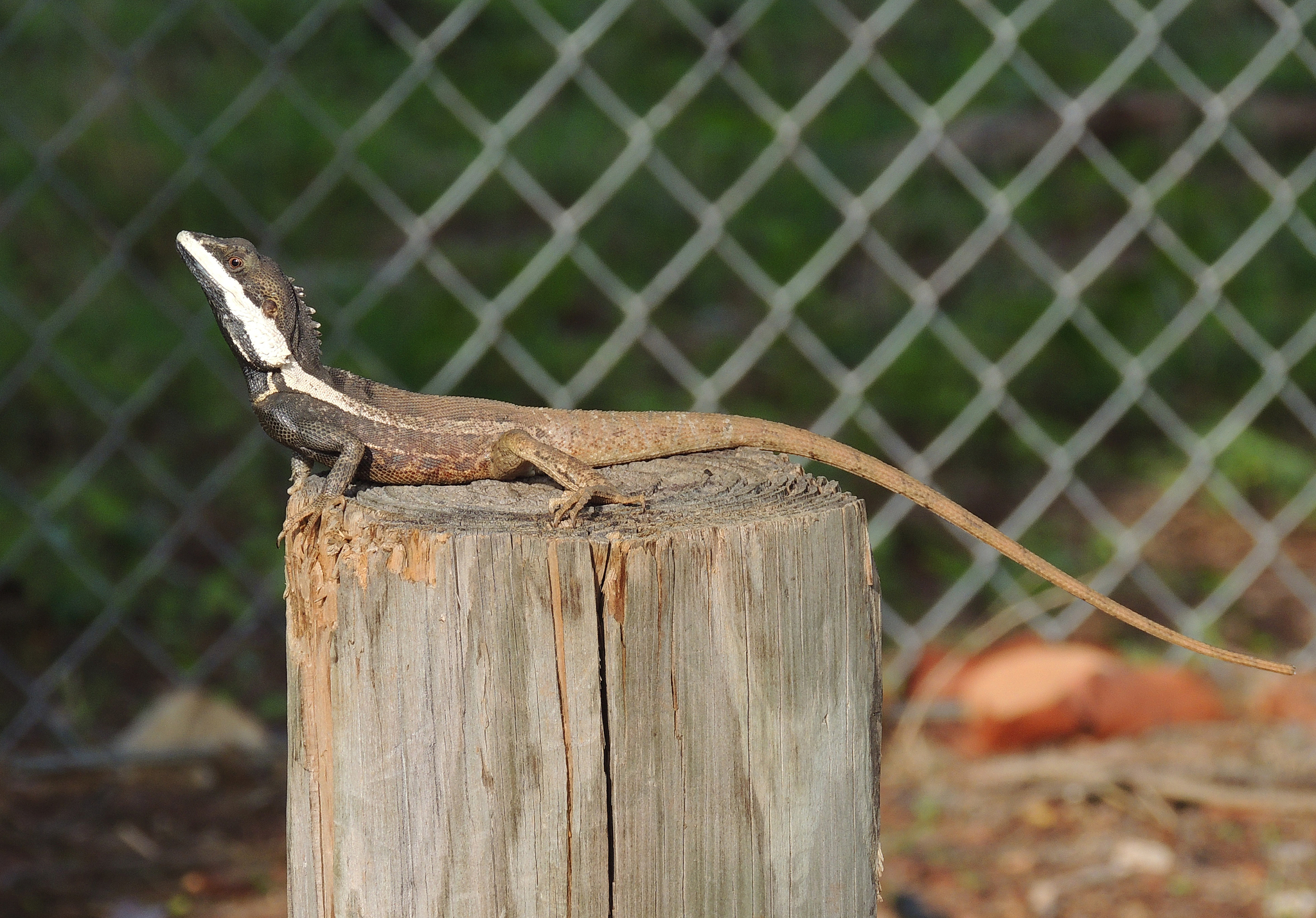
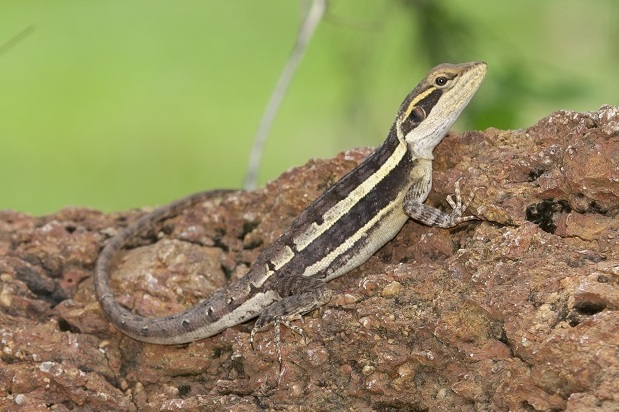
In Darwin, Northern Territory

T. temporalis is mainly found in the far northern Australian coastal regions in the Northern Territory and the western portion of the Cape York Peninsula. It also occurs in the southern part of New Guinea and on some of the islands to the north of Australia, as far north as the Maluku Islands of Indonesia.

Within its distribution, this semi-arboreal species can be found in a range of habitats, including coastal dunes, tropical savannah woodlands, monsoon forests, paperbark swamps and billabongs, creeks and riverine environments. In particular, it can be found in the Arnhem Land tropical savanna, the Cape York Peninsula tropical savanna, the Carpentaria tropical savanna, the Trans-Fly savanna and grasslands, the Victoria Plains tropical savanna, and possibly the Kimberley tropical savanna.

== Description ==
T. temporalis is a slender agamid lizard of moderate size, with long limbs and a long and slender tail. The head is narrow and moderately elongated, with a short rounded snout and a prominent canthal ridge and tympanum. A broad white stripe extends from the tip of the snout, over the lower and upper lips, continuing below the tympanum and down the lateral portion of the body. This stripe tapers off at the hind legs, and it is intersected by three dark bands at the neck, shoulders, and upper back. The portions of the head above and below this stripe are a uniform dark gray or brown color. There is a prominent dorsal crest of enlarged keeled scales extending from the occiput to the shoulder. This crest continues as a ridge from the shoulder along the spine to the base of the tail. The front legs are darker in color and have more strongly keeled scales than the hind legs. A second, shorter white stripe sometimes extends from the posterior mandible to the area of the temporomandibular joint. The snout-to-vent length is 103 millimeters (4.1 in); hindlimb length is 87 millimeters (3.4 in).

== Gallery ==
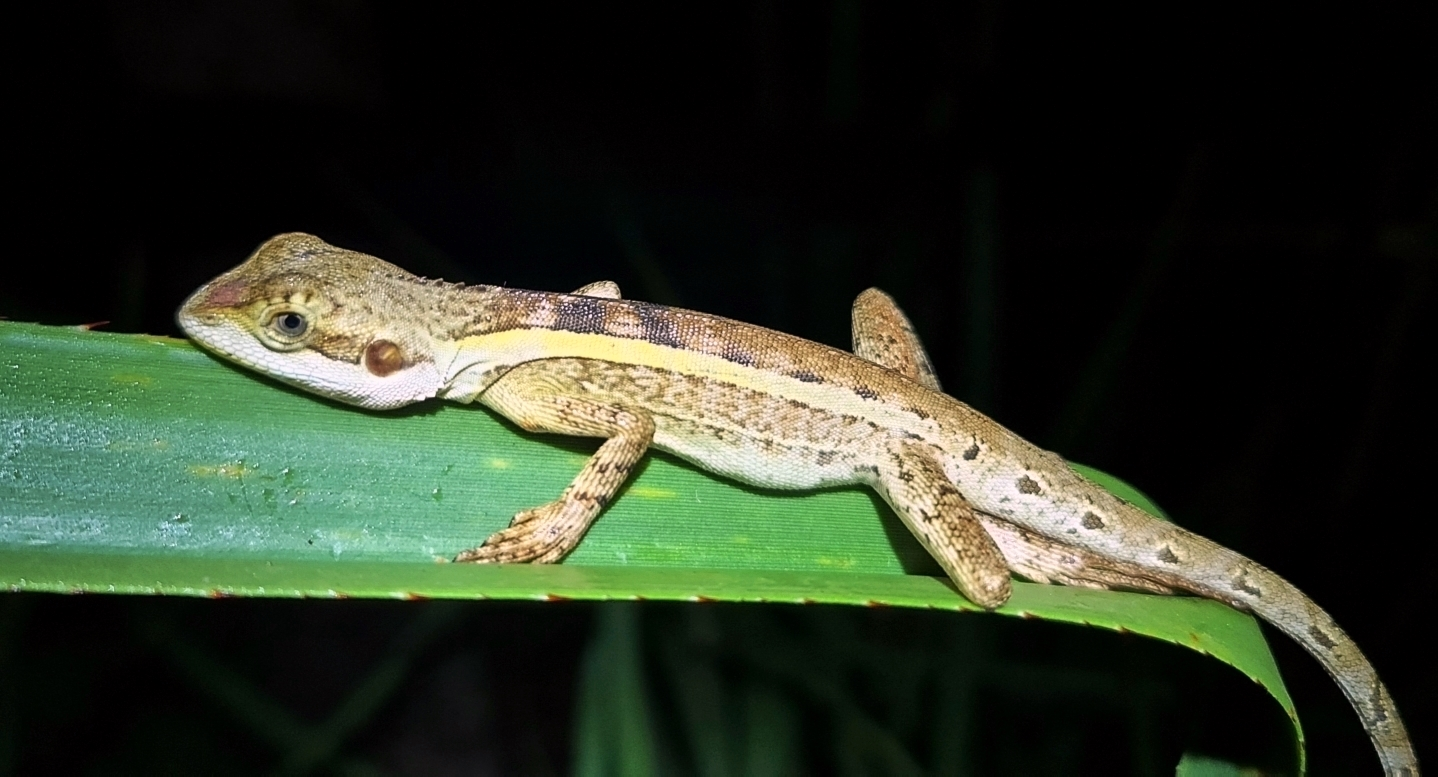

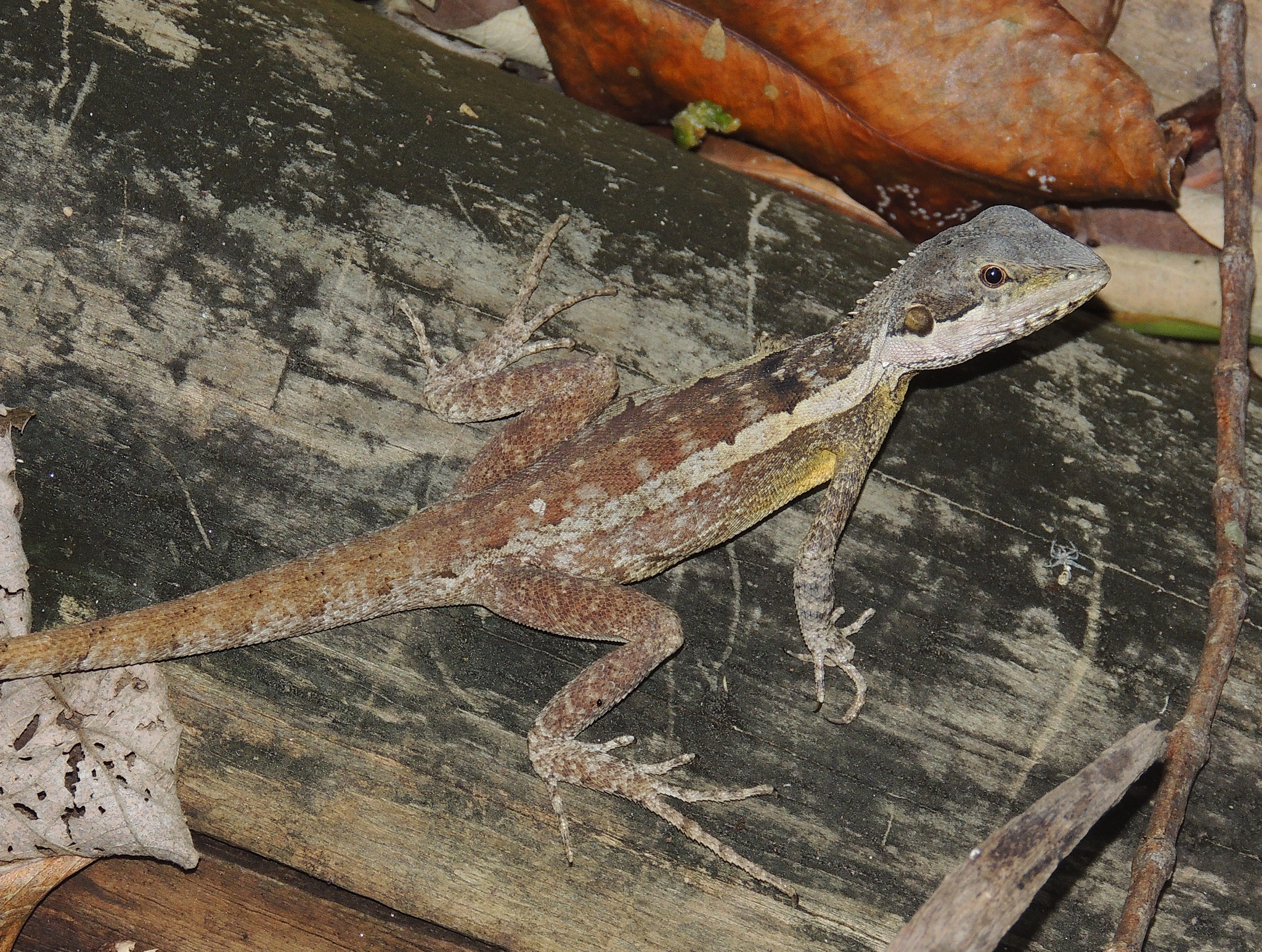

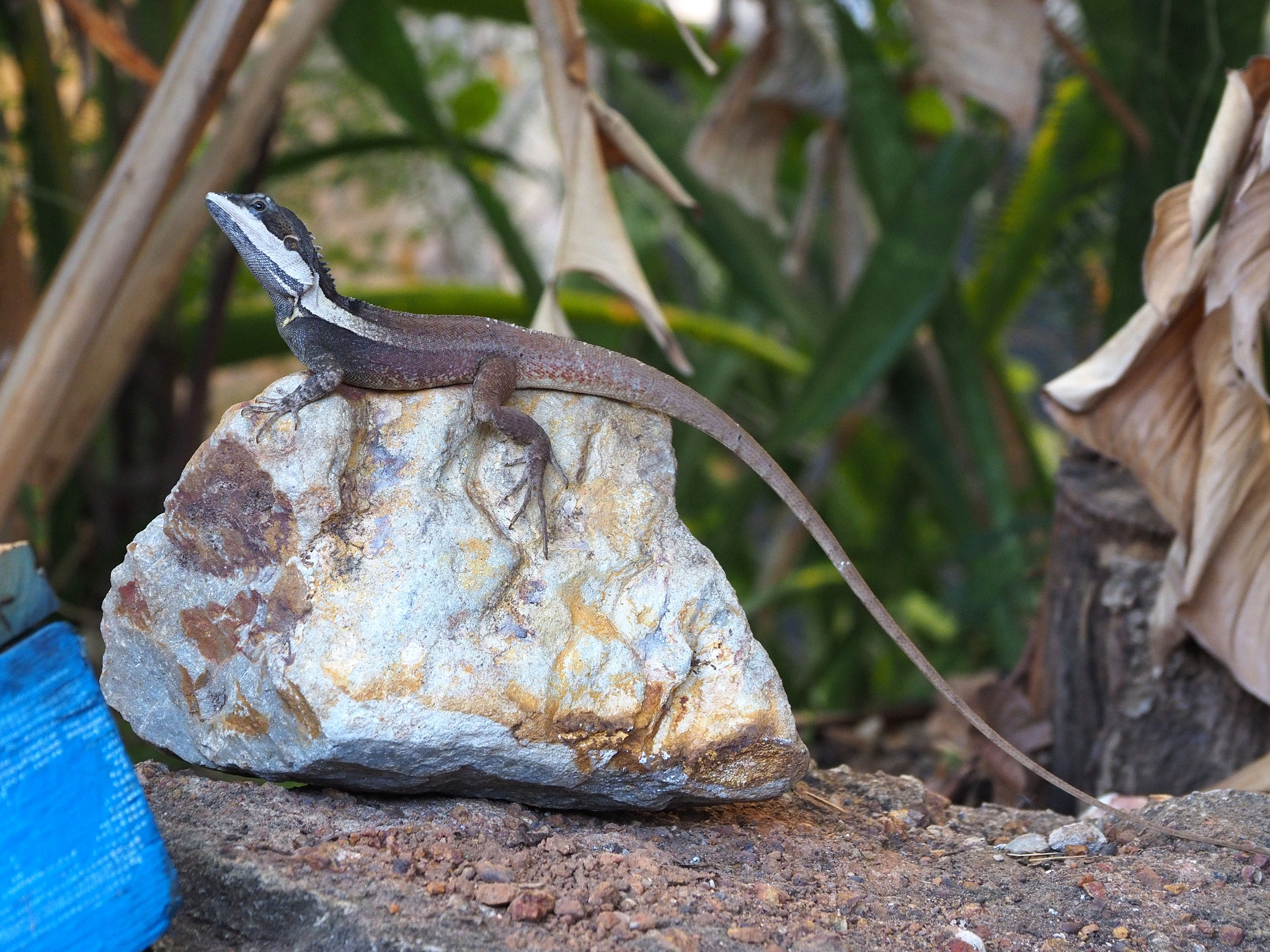

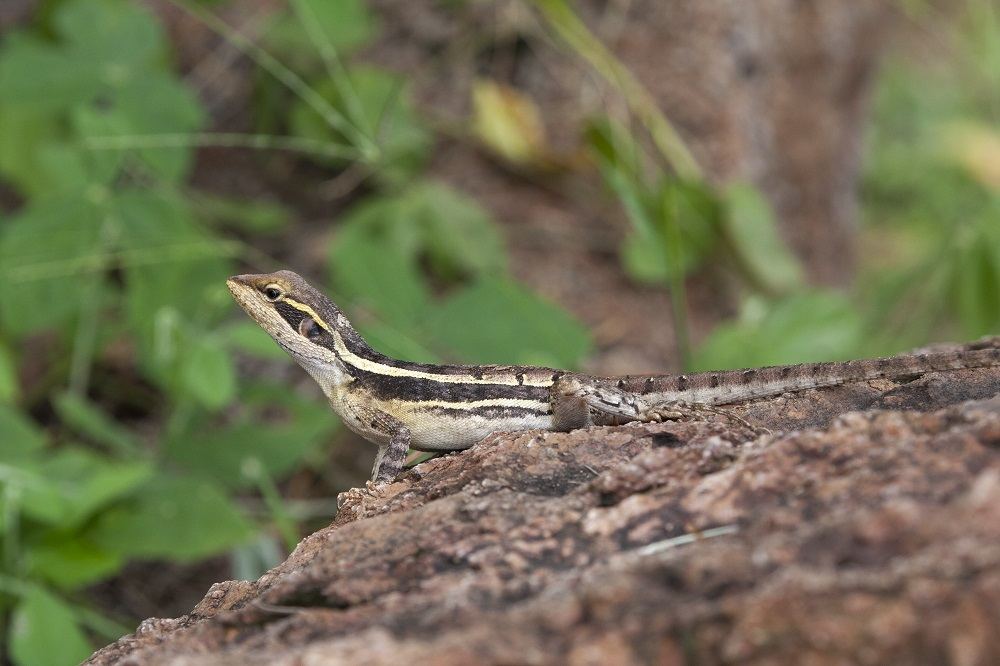

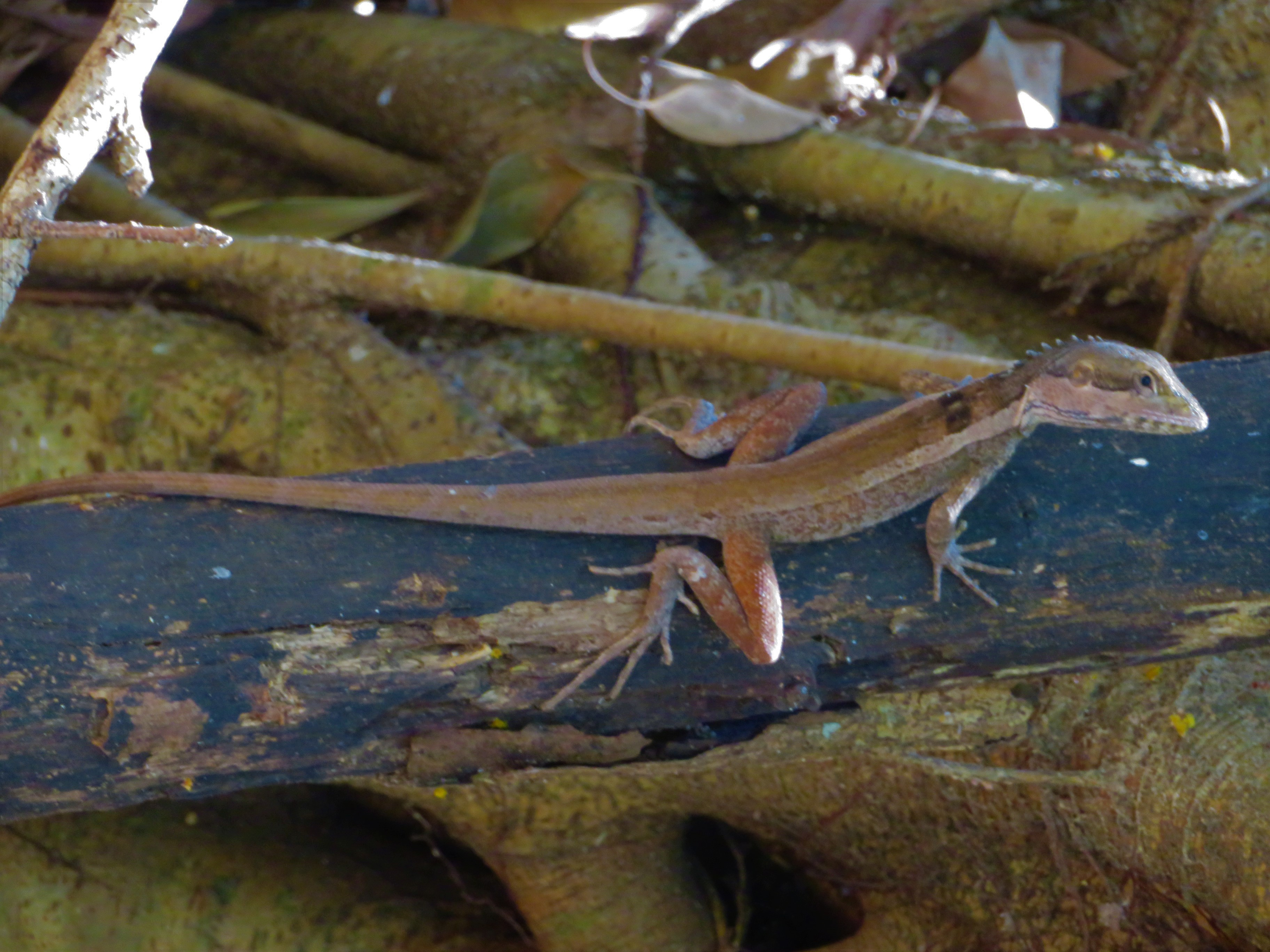
At Fogg Dam Conservation Reserve, Northern Territory, Australia
