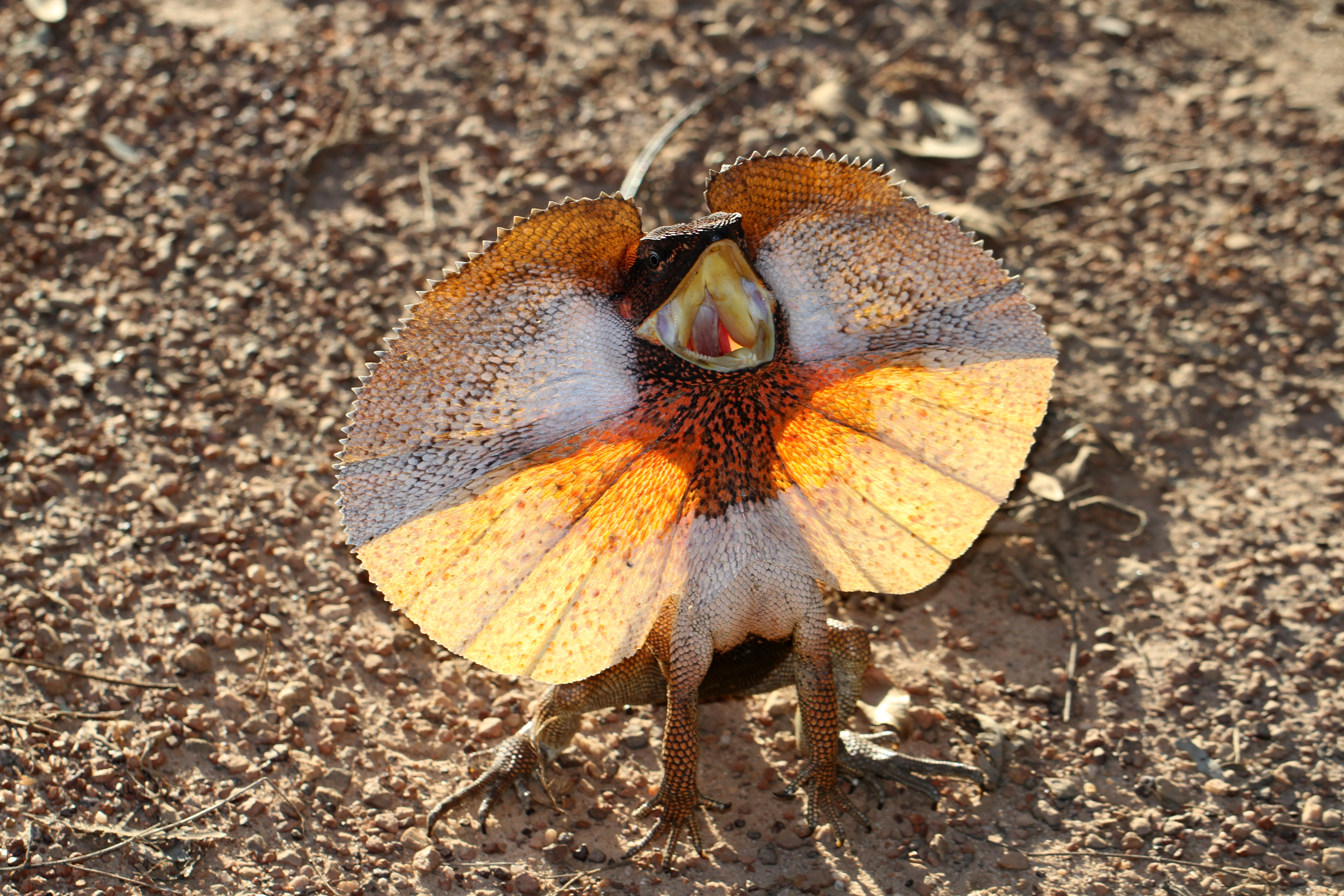

Conservation status
- Least Concern (IUCN 3.1)

Scientific classification
- Kingdom: Animalia
- Phylum: Chordata
- Class: Reptilia
- Order: Squamata
- Suborder: Iguania
- Family: Agamidae
- Subfamily: Amphibolurinae
- Genus: Chlamydosaurus; Gray, 1825
- Species: C. kingii

Binomial name
- Chlamydosaurus kingii Gray, 1825
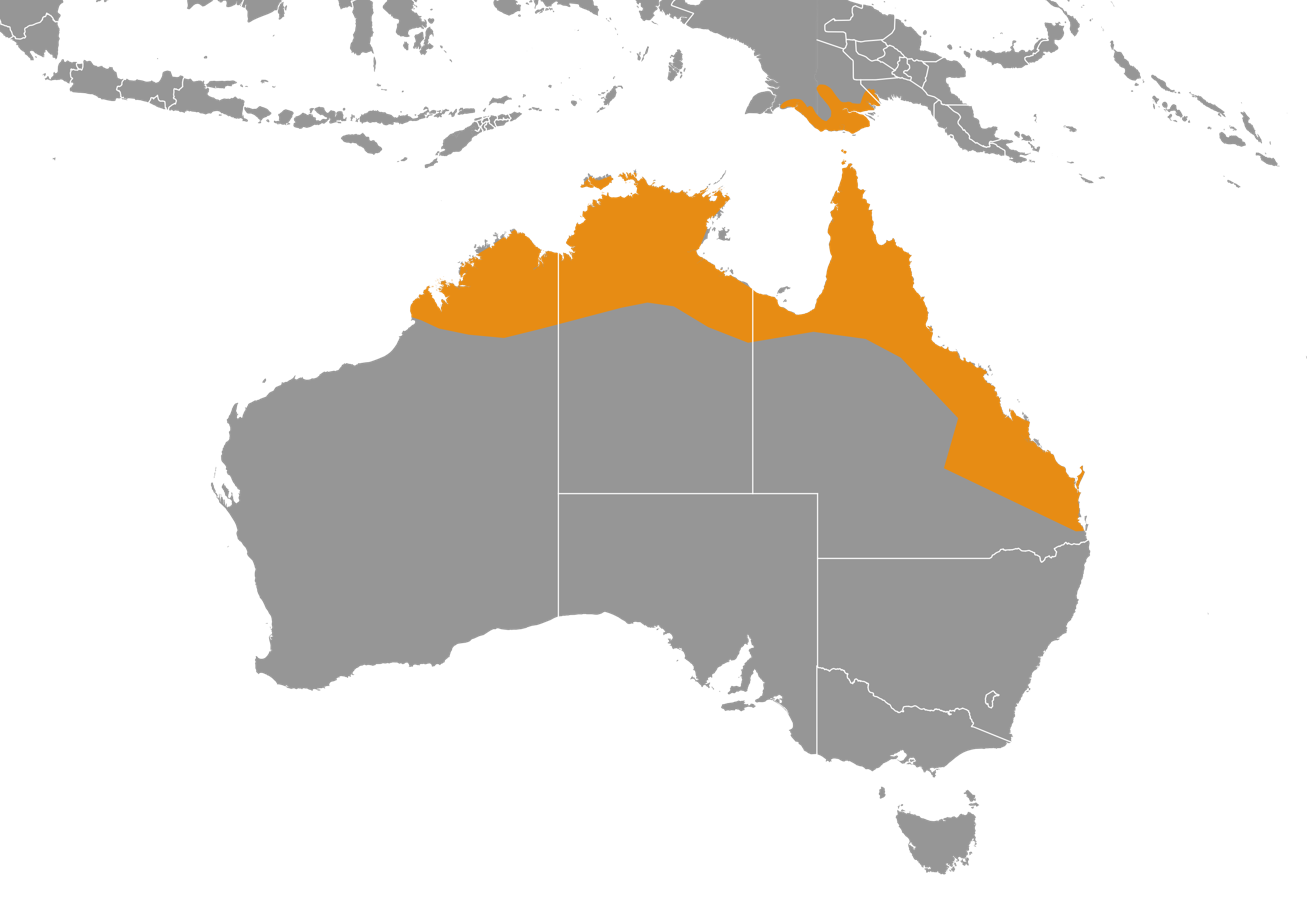
- Distribution of Chlamydosaurus kingii

Synonyms
- Clamydosaurus [sic] kingii Gray, 1825; Chlamydosaurus kingii — Gray in King, 1827 (nomen emendatum)

= Frilled lizard =

Species of reptile

The frilled lizard (Chlamydosaurus kingii), also known commonly as the frilled agama, frillneck lizard, frill-necked lizard or frilled dragon, is a species of lizard in the family Agamidae. The species is native to northern Australia and southern New Guinea and is the only member of the genus Chlamydosaurus. Its common names refer to the large frill around its neck, which usually stays folded against the lizard's body. The frilled lizard grows to 90 cm (35 in) from head to tail tip and can weigh 600 g (1.3 lb). Males are larger and more robust than females. The lizard's body is generally grey, brown, orangish-brown, or black in colour. The frills have red, orange, yellow, or white colours.

The frilled lizard is largely arboreal, spending most of its time in trees. Its diet consists mainly of insects and other invertebrates. It is more active during the wet season, when it spends more time near or on the ground, and is less observed during the dry season, during which it seeks shade in the branches of the upper canopy. It breeds in the late dry season and early wet season. The lizard uses its frill to scare off predators and display to other individuals. The species is considered to be of least concern by the International Union for Conservation of Nature.

== Taxonomy ==
British zoologist John Edward Gray described the frilled lizard in 1825 as Clamydosaurus kingii. He used a specimen collected by botanist Allan Cunningham at Careening Bay, off north-western Australia, while part of an expedition conducted by Captain Phillip Parker King in HMS Mermaid. The generic name, Chlamydosaurus, is derived from the Ancient Greek chlamydo (χλαμύς), meaning "cloaked" or "mantled", and Latin saurus (sauros), meaning "lizard". The specific name, kingii, is a Latinised form of King. It is the only species classified in its genus.

The frilled lizard is classified in the family Agamidae and the subfamily Amphibolurinae. It split from its closest living relatives around 10 million years ago based on genetic evidence. A 2017 mitochondrial DNA analysis of the species across its range revealed three lineages demarcated by the Ord River and the southeast corner of the Gulf of Carpentaria (Carpentarian Gap). One lineage ranged across Queensland and southern New Guinea and is sister to one that ranged from western Queensland to the Ord River. The ancestor of these two split from a lineage that populates the Kimberley. Frilled lizards entered southern New Guinea possibly around 17,000 years ago during a glacial cycle, when sea levels were lower and a land bridge connected the island to Cape York. The study upholds C. kingii as one species with the different populations being "shallow allopatric clades".

The following cladogram is based on Pyron and colleagues (2013).

- - Frilled lizard (Clamydosaurus kingii)
  - - Gilbert's lashtail (Lophognathus gilberti)
    - - Jacky dragon (Amphibolurus muricatus)

== Description ==
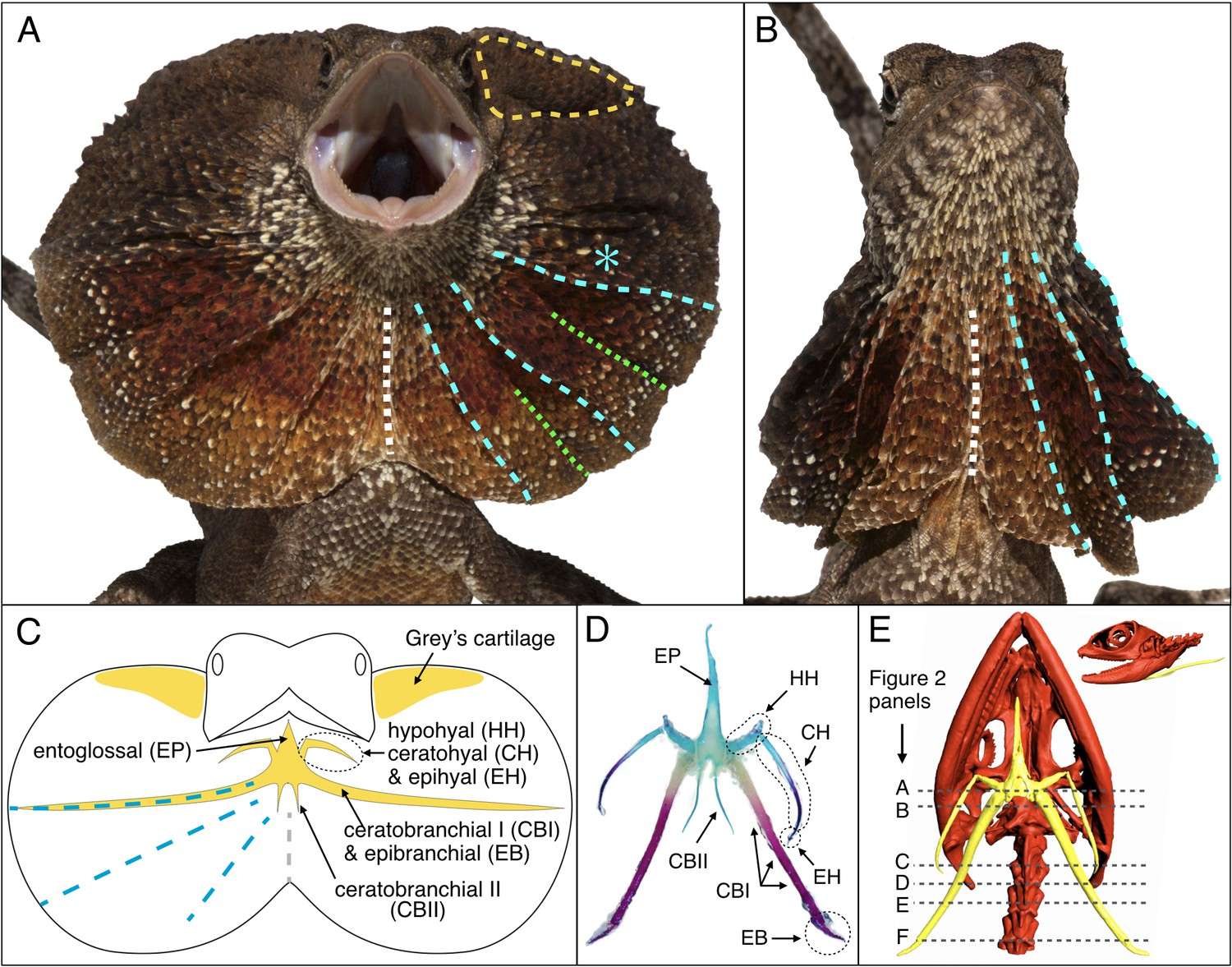
Anatomy of the frill of Chlamydosaurus kingii

The frilled lizard can reach a total length of around 90 centimetres (35 in) and a head-body length of 27 cm (11 in), and weighs at least 600 g (1.3 lb). It has a particularly large and wide head; a long neck to accommodate the frill; long legs and a tail that makes most of its total length. The species is sexually dimorphic, males being larger than females and having proportionally bigger frills, heads and jaws. The corners of the frilled lizard's eyes are pointed and the rounded nostrils face away from each other and angle downward. Most of the lizard's scales are keeled, having a ridge down the centre. From the backbone to the sides, the scales alternate between small and large.

The distinctive frill is a flap of skin that extends from the head and neck and contains several folded ridges. When fully extended, the frill is disc-shaped and can reach over four times the length of the animal's torso in diameter, or around 30 cm (12 in) across. When not extended, the frill wraps around the body, like a cape over the neck and shoulders. The frill is laterally symmetrical; the right and left sides are attached at the bottom in a V-shape, and cartilage-like connective tissue (Grey's cartilage) connects the top ends to each side of the head near the ear openings. The frill is supported by rod-like hyoid bones, and is spread out by movements of these bones, the lower jaw and Grey's cartilage. This structure mainly functions as a threat display to predators and for communication between individuals. It can also act as camouflage when folded, but this is unlikely to have been a consequence of selection pressure. The frill may be capable of working like a directional microphone, allowing them to better hear sounds directly in front of them but not around them. There is no evidence for other suggested functions, such as food storage, gliding or temperature regulation.

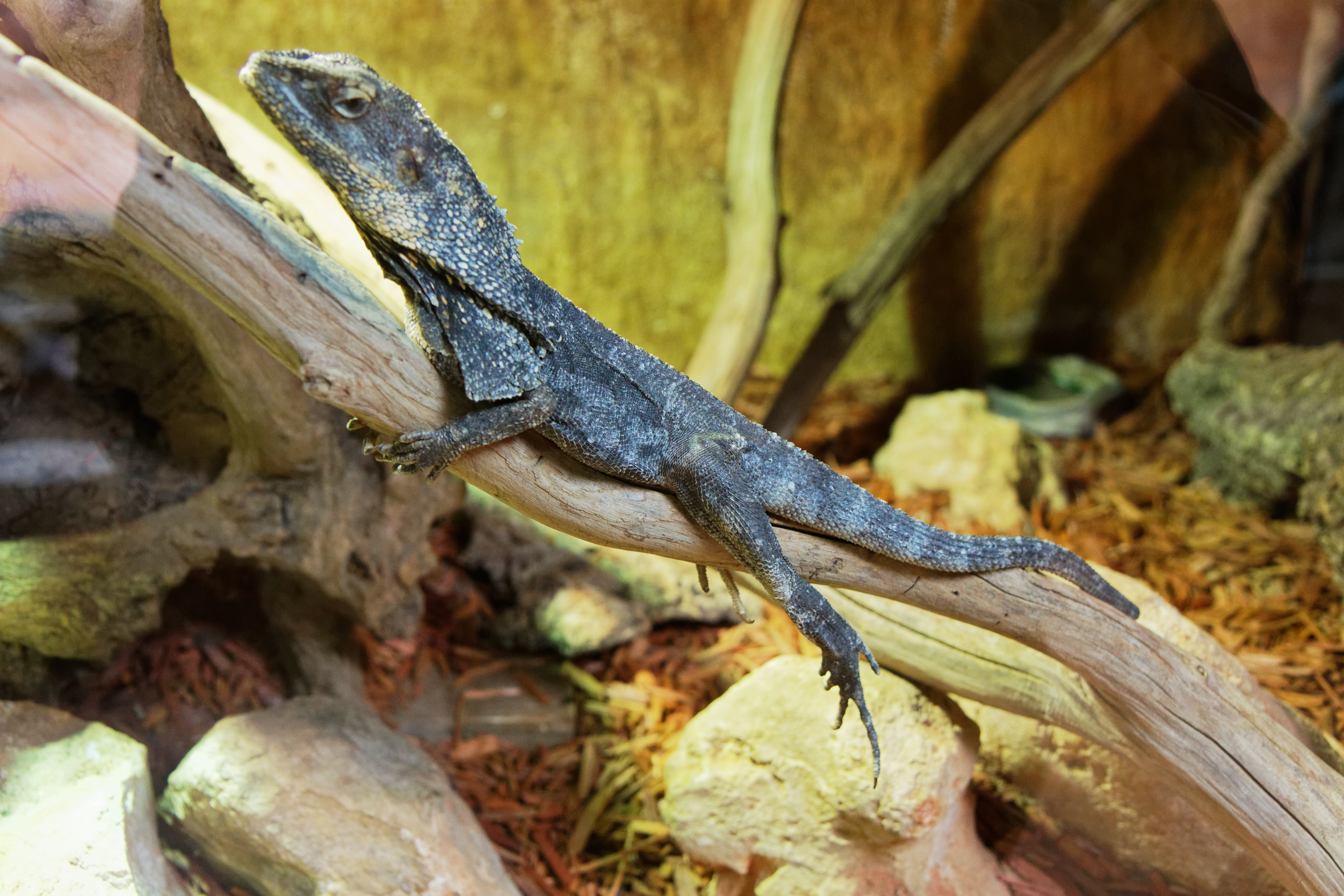
A frilled lizard in a reptile display (frill folded)

Frilled lizards vary between grey, brown, orangish-brown, and black dorsally, the underside being paler white or yellow. Males have a dark belly but a lighter chest. The underside and lateral sides of the species are sprinkled with dark brown markings that merge to create bands on the tail. The colours of the frills vary based on range; lizards west of the Ord River have red-coloured frills, those living between the river and the Carpentarian Gap have orange frills, and those east of the gap have yellow to white frills. New Guinean frilled lizards are yellow-frilled. The more colourful frills have white patches which may add to the display. Colouration is mainly created by carotenoids and pteridine pigments; lizards with red and orange frills have more carotenoids than those with yellow and white frills, the latter two are also lacking in pteridines. Yellow colouration has been linked to higher steroid hormones.

== Distribution and habitat ==
The frilled lizard inhabits northern Australia and southern New Guinea. Its Australian range stretches from the Kimberley region of Western Australia east through the Top End of the Northern Territory to Queensland's Cape York Peninsula and nearby islands of Muralug, Badu, and Moa, and south to Brisbane. In New Guinea, it lives in the Trans-Fly ecosystem on both the Papua New Guinean and Indonesian sides of the island. The species mainly inhabits savannahs and sclerophyll woodlands. It prefers highly elevated areas with good soil drainage and a greater variety of tree species, mostly Eucalyptus species, and avoids lower plains with mostly Melaleuca and Pandanus trees. Frilled lizards also prefer areas with less vegetation on the ground, as they can then better spot prey from above.

== Behaviour and ecology ==
Frilled lizard in natural environment, showing camouflage

The frilled lizard is a diurnal (daytime) and arboreal species, spending over 90% each day up in the trees. It spends as little time on the ground as possible, mostly to feed, interact socially, or to travel to a new tree. Males move around more, 69 m (75 yd) per day on average versus 23 m (25 yd) for females at Kakadu National Park. In the same area, male lizards were found to have an average home range of 1.96 ha (4.8 acres) during the dry season and 2.53 ha (6.3 acres) during the wet season; females used 0.63 ha (1.6 acres) and 0.68 ha (1.7 acres) for the wet and dry seasons, respectively. Male lizards assert their boundaries with frill displays. Frilled lizards are capable of moving bipedally and do so while hunting or to escape from predators. To keep balanced, they lean their heads far back enough, so it lines up behind the tail base.

These lizards are more active during the wet season, when they select smaller trees and are more commonly seen near the ground; during the dry season, they use larger trees and are found at greater heights. Frilled lizards do not enter torpidity during the dry season, but they can greatly reduce their energy usage and metabolic rate in response to less food and water. Body temperatures can approach 40 °C (104 °F). The species will bask vertically on the main tree trunk in the morning and near the end of the day, though in the dry season they cease basking at a lower body temperature to better maintain energy and water. When it gets hotter during day, they climb higher in the canopy for shade. Frilled lizards will use large trees and termite mounds as refuges during wildfires. After a forest is burnt, the lizards select trees with more continuous canopies.

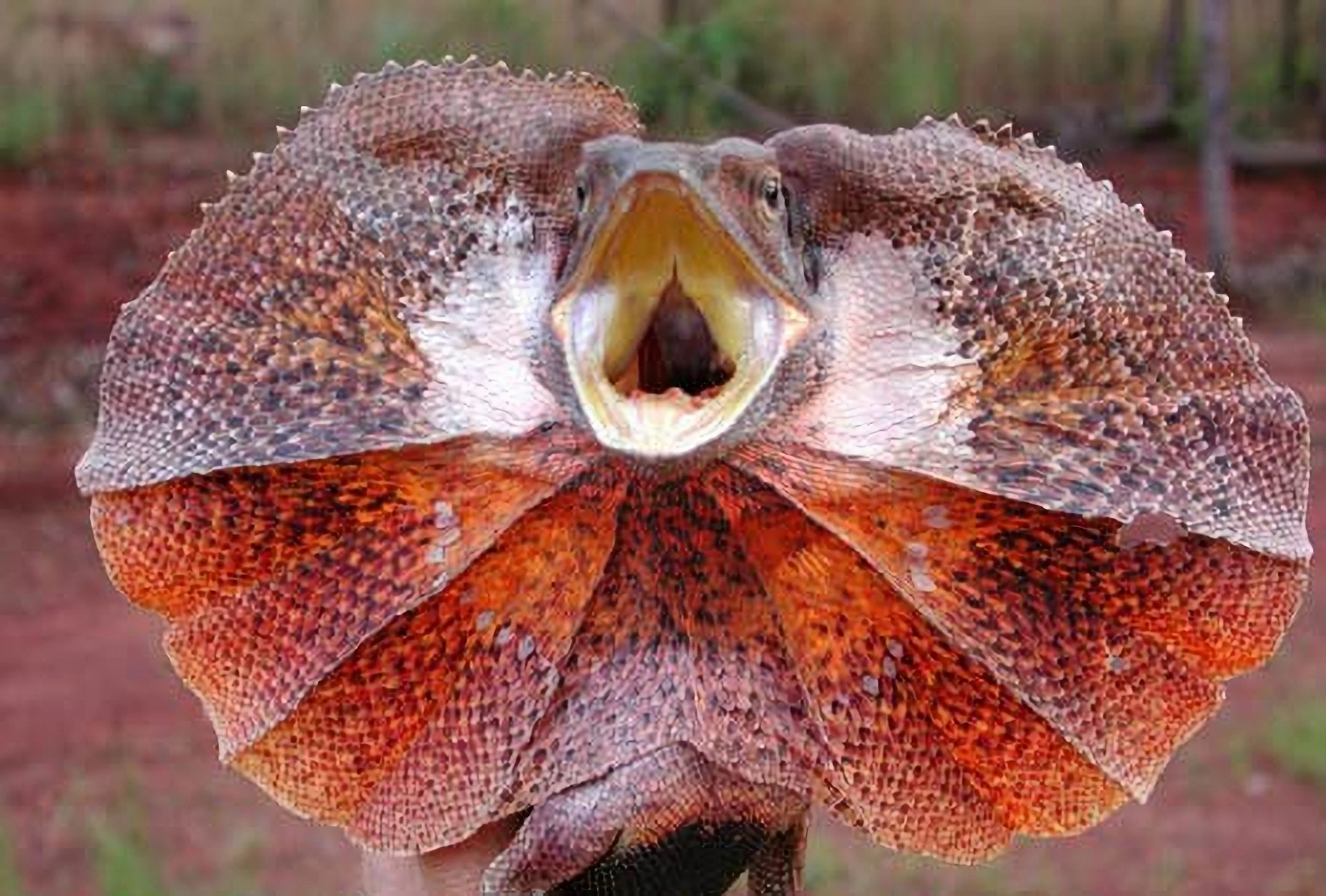
Frilled lizard in threat display

Frilled lizards primarily feed on insects and other invertebrates, and very rarely take vertebrates. Prominent prey includes termites, ants and centipedes; termites are particularly important food during the dry season, and moth larvae become important during the wet season. Consumption of ants drops after early dry season fires but rises following fires later in the season. This species is a sit-and-wait predator: it watches for potential prey from a tree and, upon seeing it, climbs down and rushes towards it on two legs before descending on all four to grab and eat it. After feeding, it retreats up a tree.

Frilled lizards face threats from birds of prey and larger lizards and snakes. When threatened, the species erects its frill to make itself look bigger. This display is accompanied by a gaping mouth, puffing, hissing, and tail lashes. The lizard may also flee and hide from its predators. Several species of nematode infest the gastrointestinal tract. There is at least one record of an individual dying of cryptosporidiosis.

Frilled lizards can breed during the late dry and early wet seasons. Competing males display with gaping mouths and spread frills. Fights can ensue, in which the lizards pounce and bite each other's heads. The female digs a shallow cavity to leave her eggs. They can lay multiple clutches per season, and the number of eggs in a clutch can vary from four to over 20. The incubation period can last two to four months, with milder temperatures producing more males and more extreme temperatures producing more females. Hatchlings have proportionally smaller frills than adults. Lizards grow during the wet season when food is more abundant, and males grow faster than females. Juvenile males also disperse further from their hatching area. The species reaches sexual maturity within two years; males live up to six years compared to four years for females.

== Conservation ==
The International Union for Conservation of Nature lists the frilled lizard as of least concern, due to its abundance and wide range, but warns that its population may be locally declining in some areas. It is a popular species in the pet trade, which may threaten some wild populations. Most pet lizards appear to come from Indonesia, as export of them is banned in Australia and Papua New Guinea. Nevertheless, the Indonesian government themselves have allocated the frilled lizard as a protected species under the Article 20 of the Environment and Forestry Ministerial Regulation On Types of Protected Plants and Animals. Being difficult to breed in captivity, many presumed captive bred lizards are likely to have been taken from the wild. Frilled lizards may also be threatened by feral cats, though they do not appear to be significantly affected by the invasive cane toad.

== Relationship with humans ==
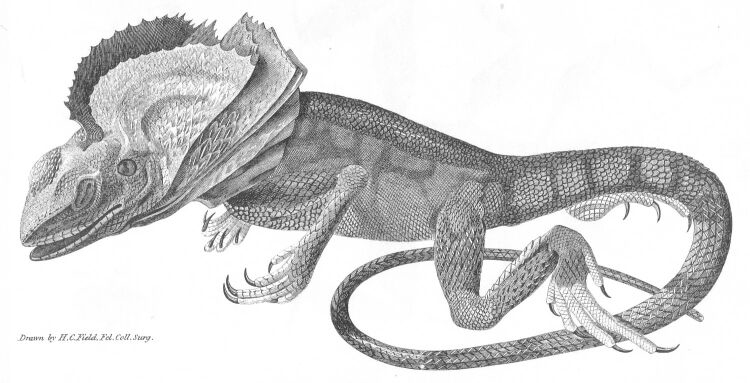
Frilled lizard from Narrative of a Survey Volume 2, by Phillip Parker King, 1827

The frilled lizard is considered to be among the most iconic Australian animals along with the kangaroo and koala. Archaeological evidence indicates that frilled lizards were eaten by some indigenous peoples in ancient times. In the late 19th century, William Saville-Kent brought a live lizard to England where it was observed by fellow biologists. Another specimen was kept at a reptile display in Paris, as reptiles were becoming more popular in captivity.

Because of its unique appearance and behaviour, the creature has often been used in media. In Steven Spielberg's 1993 film Jurassic Park, the dinosaur Dilophosaurus was portrayed with a similar neck frill that rose when attacking. Its image has been used in the 1994 LGBT-themed film The Adventures of Priscilla, Queen of the Desert. The species has been featured on some Australian coins.
