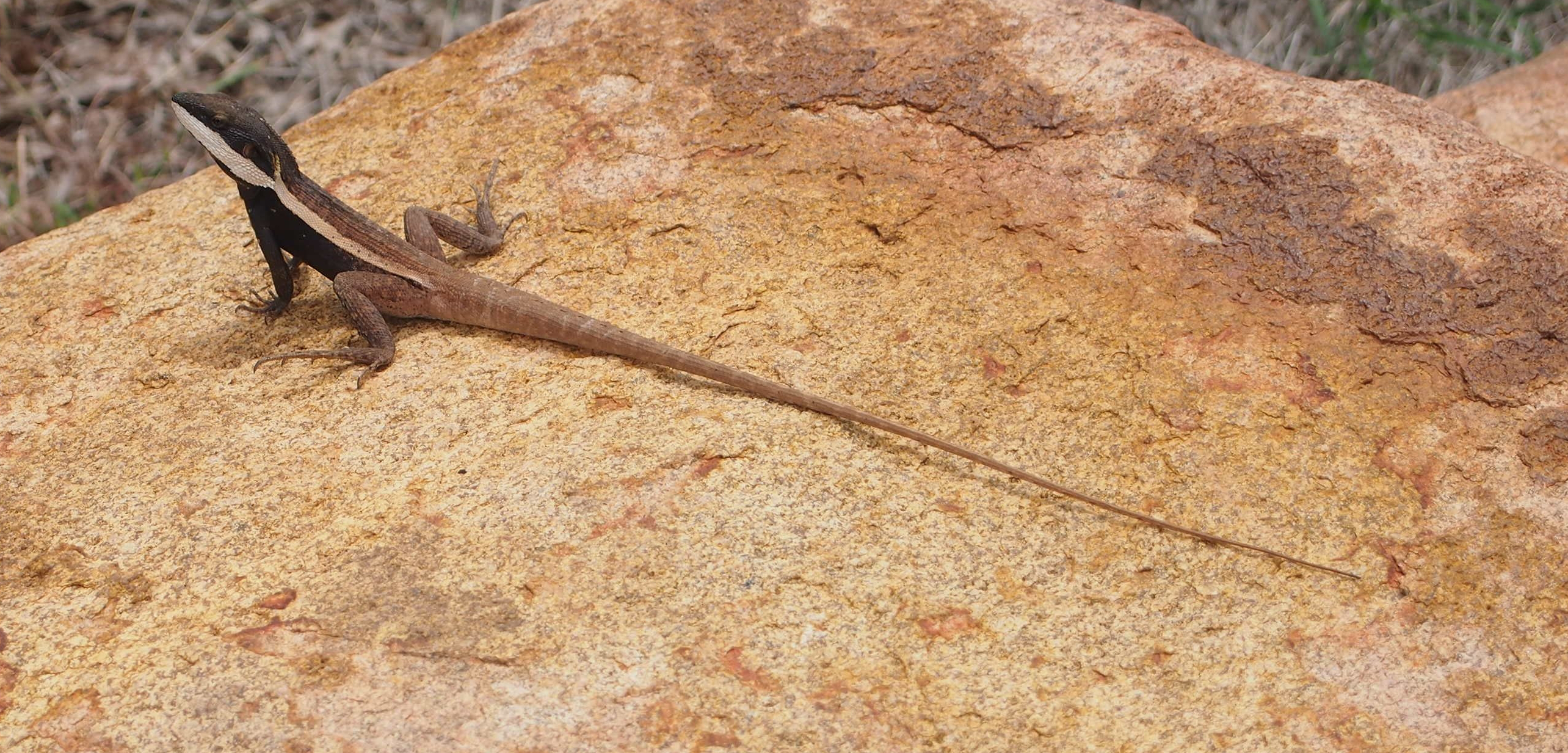
- Lophognathus gilberti

Scientific classification
- Domain: Eukaryota
- Kingdom: Animalia
- Phylum: Chordata
- Class: Reptilia
- Order: Squamata
- Suborder: Iguania
- Family: Agamidae
- Subfamily: Amphibolurinae
- Genus: Lophognathus; Gray, 1842

= Lophognathus =

Genus of lizards

Lophognathus is a genus of large-bodied agamid lizards, consisting of two species — L. gilberti and L. horneri — both of which are endemic to northern Australia. Along with several other closely related genera (e.g., Amphibolurus, Gowidon, and Tropicagama), these lizards are commonly referred to as "dragons". In Australia, these lizards are also colloquially known as "Ta Ta" lizards, due to their habit of "waving" after running across hot surfaces.

Lophognathus are slender, slightly compressed, semi-arboreal lizards. They occur in a variety of habitats, including sand dunes and arid regions, but frequently near watercourses.

== Taxonomy ==
The genus Lophognathus was originally named and described by John Edward Gray in 1842.

== Species ==
Two species are currently recognized in this genus:

Species	Common name	Image
Lophognathus gilberti Gray, 1842	Gilbert's dragon, Gilbert's lashtail	
Lophognathus horneri Melville, Ritchie, Chapple, Glor & Schulte, 2018	Horner's dragon	

Two species formerly included in genus Lophognathus have been reclassified, as follows:

- Lophognathus temporalis (also known as Amphibolurus temporalis, Gemmatophora temporalis, Gowidon temporalis, Grammatophora temporalis, Physignathus temporalis, Lophognathus labialis, Lophognathus lateralis, and Lophognathus maculilabris) has been reclassified as Tropicagama temporalis
- Lophognathus burnsi has been reclassified as Amphibolurus burnsi
