= Amphibolurus norrisi =

Conservation status
- Least Concern (IUCN 3.1)

Scientific classification
- Kingdom: Animalia
- Phylum: Chordata
- Class: Reptilia
- Order: Squamata
- Suborder: Iguania
- Family: Agamidae
- Genus: Amphibolurus
- Species: A. norrisi

Binomial name
- Amphibolurus norrisi Witten & Coventry, 1984
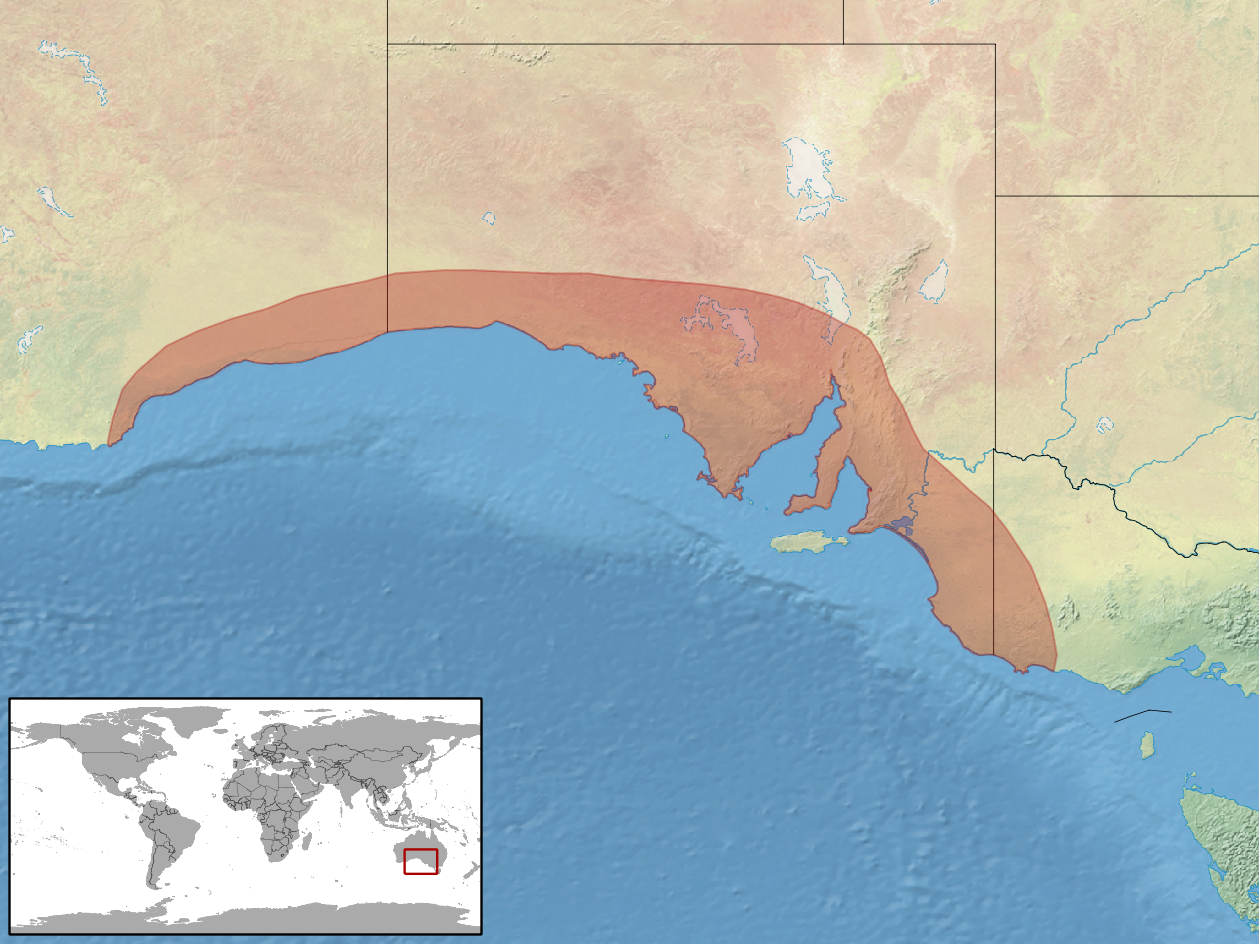

Species of reptile

Amphibolurus norrisi is a species of semi-arboreal lizard in the family Agamidae. The species is endemic to Australia.

== Etymology ==
The specific name, norrisi, is in honor of Australian zoologist Kenneth Charles Norris.

== Common names ==
Common names for Amphibolurus norrisi include Mallee heath dragon, Mallee heath lashtail, Mallee heath lashtail dragon, Mallee tree dragon, Norris's dragon, and Norris' dragon lizard.

== Taxonomy ==
The taxonomic description of Amphibolurus norrisi was published by Witten and Coventry in 1984 and was updated by Hoser in 2015. The initial specimen was collected by Coventry and Norris in 1978 and was contained by the Museum of Victoria after its classification in 1984.

== Description ==
The Mallee heath dragon has a predominantly pale grey body with darker grey stripes on the flanks and one darker grey vertebral stripe. The vertebral stripe has lateral extensions across the body which sometimes connect to the stripes on the flanks to the point where the lighter body colour is reduced to smaller blotches. Lateral extensions continue onto the tail and gradually become cross bands towards its tip. A dark streak extends from the snout to the ear. Above it, a light streak extends from behind the eye across to the ear. There are enlarged vertebral, paravertebral and dorsolateral scales. The dorsal scales are keeled and parallel to the vertebral scales. The snout-to-vent length (SVL) is about 11 cm (4.3 in). The tail length is 200% SVL.

When threatened this species has the ability to engage in fast-paced bipedal running.

== Geographic distribution and habitat ==
The Mallee heath dragon is found within western Victoria and neighboring area of South Australia, extending across coastal regions of the Great Australian Bight and into a small area of Western Australia. It is usually confined to areas of Mallee habitat and is often found within Mallee heathlands.

== Ecology ==
=== Diet ===
There is little literature specifying diet of the Mallee heath dragon, but following the diets of similar Amphibolurus species, deductions on the general dietary preferences can be made. Small arthropods like grasshoppers, spiders and beetles have been observed preferences in laboratory experiments although it is believed that most small arthropods would be consumed by the Mallee heath dragon.

=== Response to fire ===
Being endemic to a fire prone area, the Mallee heath dragon has evolved to be resistant to fire events. Its semi-arboreal patterns and bipedal running ability allow it to avoid small low-intensity fires, however lower population sizes have been noted after significant fire events.

== Reproduction ==
Amphibolurus norrisi is oviparous.

== Conservation ==
The Mallee heath dragon is classified as least concern under the IUCN Red List and therefore has no conservation work being conducted on it.
