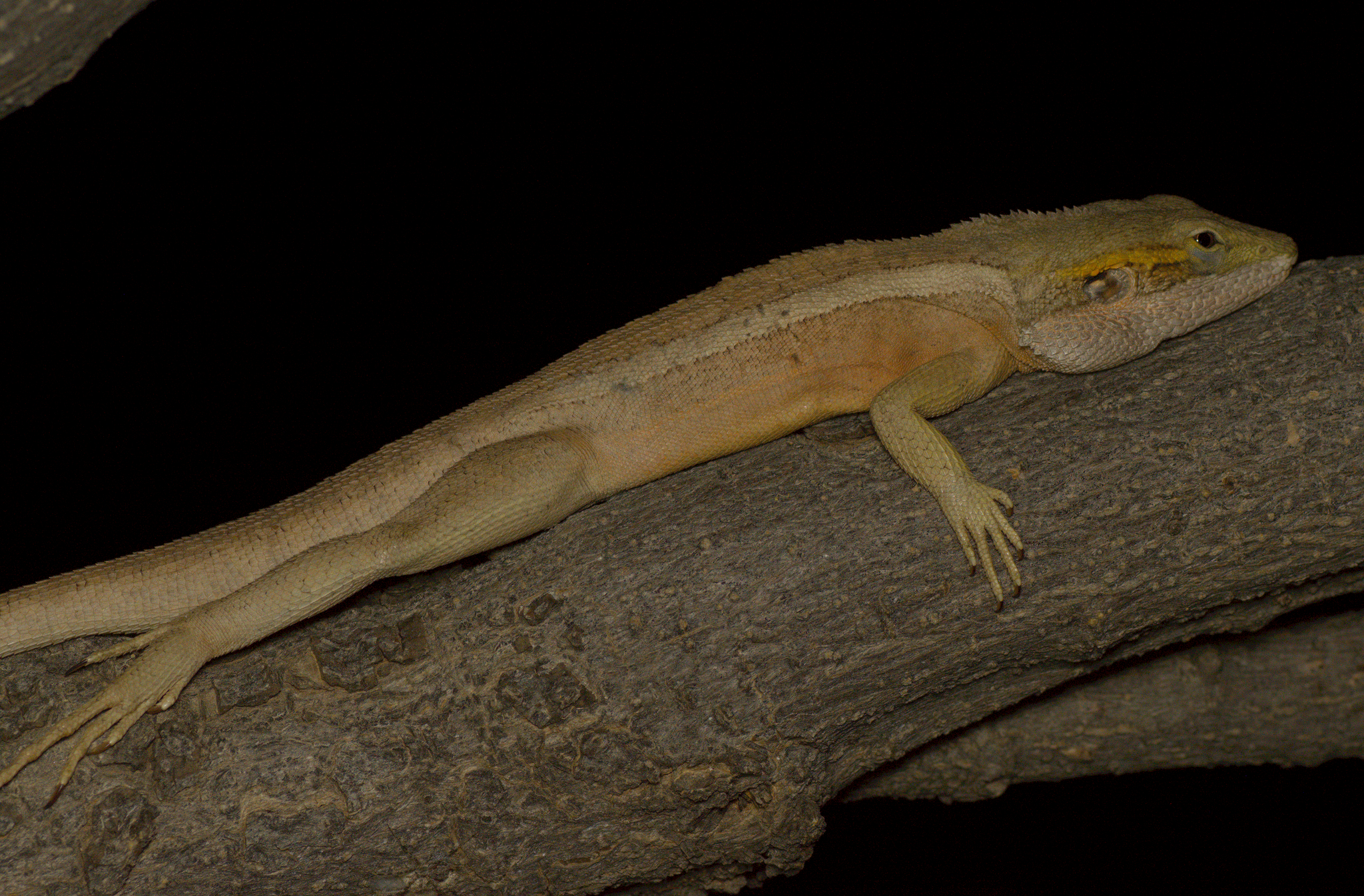

Scientific classification
- Domain: Eukaryota
- Kingdom: Animalia
- Phylum: Chordata
- Class: Reptilia
- Order: Squamata
- Suborder: Iguania
- Family: Agamidae
- Genus: Amphibolurus
- Species: A. centralis

Binomial name
- Amphibolurus centralis (Loveridge, 1933)

= Amphibolurus centralis =

Species of lizard

Amphibolurus centralis, the Centralian lashtail, is a species of agama found in Australia.
