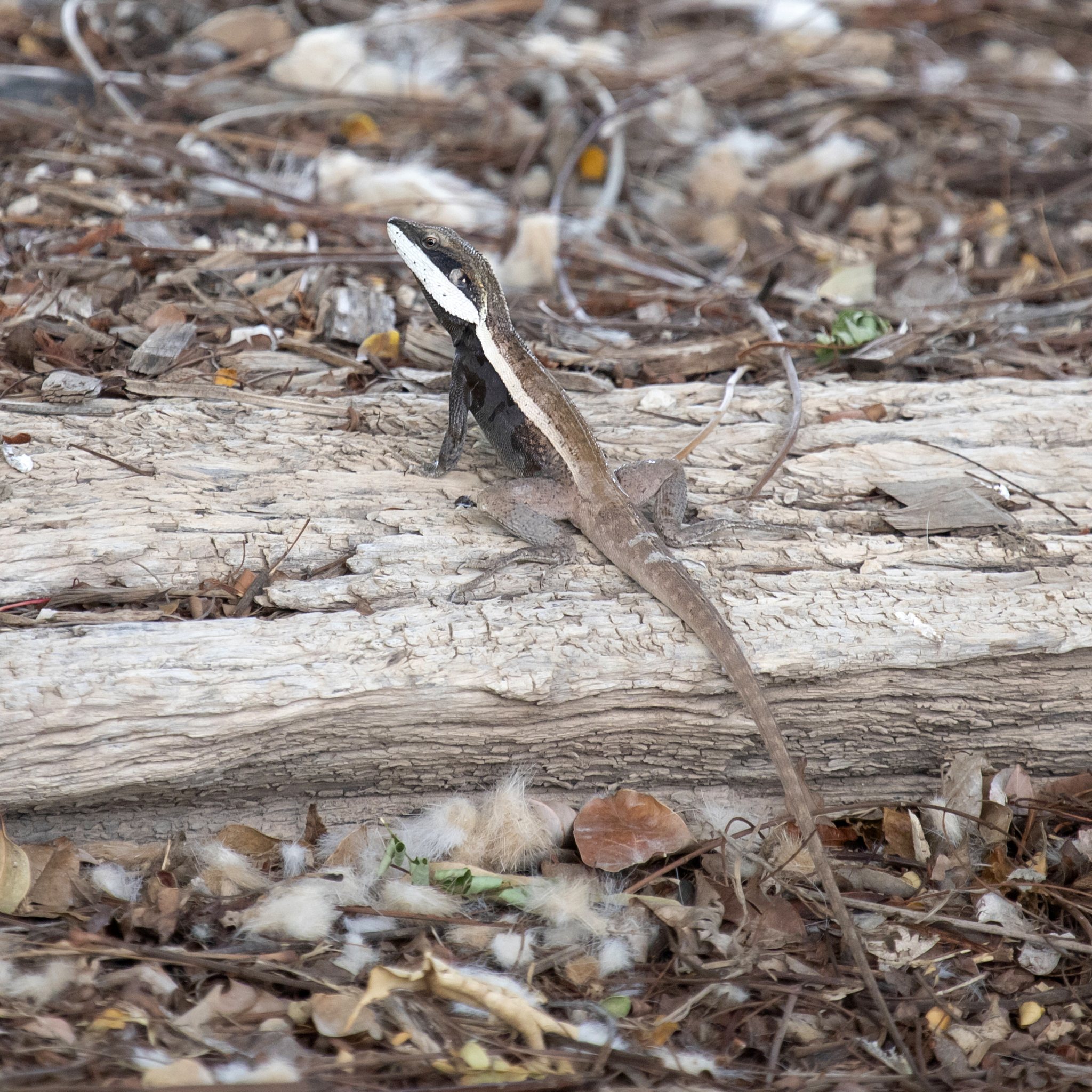

Scientific classification
- Domain: Eukaryota
- Kingdom: Animalia
- Phylum: Chordata
- Class: Reptilia
- Order: Squamata
- Suborder: Iguania
- Family: Agamidae
- Genus: Lophognathus
- Species: L. horneri

Binomial name
- Lophognathus horneri Melville, Ritchie, Chapple, Glor, & Schulte, 2018

= Lophognathus horneri =

Species of lizard

Lophognathus horneri is a species of agama found in Australia.
