= Amphibolurus burnsi =

Conservation status
- Least Concern (IUCN 3.1)

Scientific classification
- Kingdom: Animalia
- Phylum: Chordata
- Class: Reptilia
- Order: Squamata
- Suborder: Iguania
- Family: Agamidae
- Genus: Amphibolurus
- Species: A. burnsi

Binomial name
- Amphibolurus burnsi (Wells & Wellington, 1985)

Species of lizard

Amphibolurus burnsi, Burn's dragon, is a species of agama found in Australia.
