= Albert John Coventry =

Australian herpetologist (1936–2007)

A. John Coventry
- Born: 24 April 1936; Fairfield, Victoria, Australia
- Died: 1 April 2007 (aged 70); Melton, Victoria, Australia
- Known for: Herpetology of Victoria; field collecting; co-author of The Snakes of Victoria and Field Guide to Reptiles of Victoria
- Scientific career
- Fields: Herpetology
- Institutions: National Museum of Victoria

Albert John Coventry (24 April 1936 – 1 April 2007), usually cited as A. John Coventry, was an Australian herpetologist, primarily associated with the National Museum of Victoria.

== Biography ==
Coventry was born in Fairfield, a suburb of Melbourne, the son of a Baptist pastor. He spent his early school years in rural Victoria, where he became familiar with the local bushland.

He attended the Carey Baptist Grammar School, leaving in 1953 after completing Year 11. In April 1954, he began working at the National Museum of Victoria, initially as a museum attendant, a role he obtained thanks to his bush-acquired skills in vehicle repair. He later became a field assistant to Joan M. Dixon. Without any college or university education, he acquired his skills through practice under the guidance of mammal curator Charles W. Brazenor. Because the bird and mammal collections were already well curated, in 1971 Coventry took on primary responsibility for the amphibian and reptile collections. Until then, the museum had never employed a dedicated herpetologist, though it possessed historically significant reptile collections by Charles Frost, Walter Baldwin Spencer, and Donald Thomson. These had not been properly catalogued or curated, and Coventry recognized the importance of documenting them to make the information accessible for wider use. He later added further major collections from Murray J. Littlejohn, Angus Martin, Peter Rawlinson, and Graeme Watson.

Coventry was also a skilled field collector, conducting surveys in Victoria and other parts of Australia to build a representative comparative collection. By the time he retired, the herpetological collection had grown to 75,000 fully documented and databased specimens. In 1974, Coventry was appointed head of the herpetological collection. Due to his lack of a university degree, however, museum rules initially prevented him from being appointed curator. Nevertheless, his expertise was recognized by colleagues at other museums and universities, and in 1985 the museum promoted him to Curator of Herpetology, and in 1986 to Senior Curator.

His curatorship ended in 2002, but he continued to collect for the museum. Between 1970 and 2009 he published about 15 herpetological articles. He was among the first describers of the skink Hemiergis millewae and the agamid Amphibolurus norrisi. His works included catalogues of museum species, distribution records, identification of material from key localities, and taxonomic revisions. He also completed the museum work begun by Peter Alan Rawlinson, who could no longer work with preserved specimens due to an alcohol allergy.

Coventry co-authored two standard works on the reptiles of Victoria with Peter Robertson, a wildlife ecologist with the state Department of Conservation and Environment. Their first book, The Snakes of Victoria (1991), is a 70-page field handbook with keys and distribution maps covering 27 species in four families, including 21 lizards, illustrated with Robertson’s photographs. Their second book, Field Guide to Reptiles of Victoria (2009), expanded the first to include lizards and turtles, tripling its length, with keys, detailed species accounts, and additional photographs.

== Eponyms ==
Two species are named in his honour: Carinascincus coventryi and Lissolepis coventryi.

== Publications ==
- A. John Coventry & Peter Robertson. The Snakes of Victoria. Department of Conservation and Environment, Victoria, 1991.
- A. John Coventry & Peter Robertson. Field Guide to Reptiles of Victoria. CSIRO Publishing, 2009.
