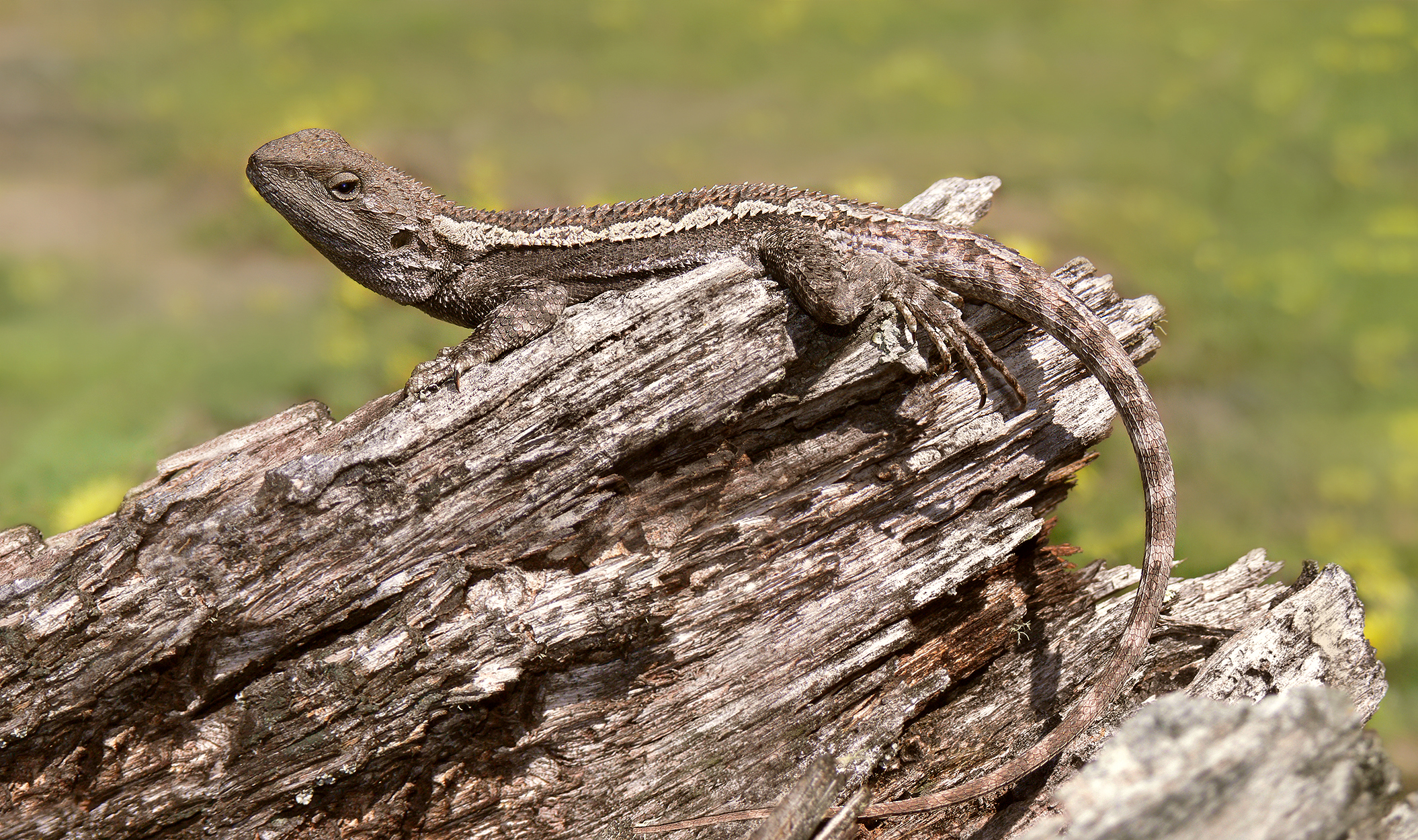
- Tree dragon Amphibolurus muricatus

Scientific classification
- Kingdom: Animalia
- Phylum: Chordata
- Class: Reptilia
- Order: Squamata
- Suborder: Iguania
- Family: Agamidae
- Subfamily: Amphibolurinae
- Genus: Amphibolurus; Wagler, 1830

Type species
- Draco muricatus White, 1790

= Amphibolurus =

Genus of reptiles

Amphibolurus is a genus of lizards in the family Agamidae. The genus is endemic to Australia.

== Description ==
Characteristics of the genus Amphibolurus include:

- Moderate size [snout–vent length 8.4–13.5 cm (3.3–5.3 in)]
- Long limbs and long tail
- One to five crests consisting of enlarged, sometimes spinose scales (one nuchal and vertebral crest, sometime one or two dorsal crests on each side)
- Tympanum exposed
- One to 11 femoral pores and one to three preanal pores on each side
- Pattern usually includes three broad pale dorsal stripes and some blotches on a usually brown ground coloration
- Different from the similar species Lophognathus and Gowidon due to more heterogeneous arrangement of scales. They also differ from Gowidon due to more dorsal rows of enlarged, spinose scales.

== Habitat ==
Amphibolurus lizards inhabit open forests, woodlands, and the vegetation around watercourses in southern, eastern, and central Australia.

== Behaviour ==
Species in the genus Amphibolurus are partially arboreal and are often found perching on trunks and branches. Lizards of this genus are swift and shy, and when disturbed, they can engage in bipedal running.

== Species ==
The following species are recognized as being valid, according to the Reptile Database.

- Amphibolurus burnsi (Wells & Wellington, 1985) – Burn's dragon
- Amphibolurus centralis (Loveridge, 1933) – Centralian lashtail
- Amphibolurus muricatus (White, 1790) – jacky dragon
- Amphibolurus norrisi Witten & Coventry, 1984 – Mallee Heath lashtail

Nota bene: A binomial authority in parentheses indicates that the species was originally described in a genus other than Amphibolurus.
