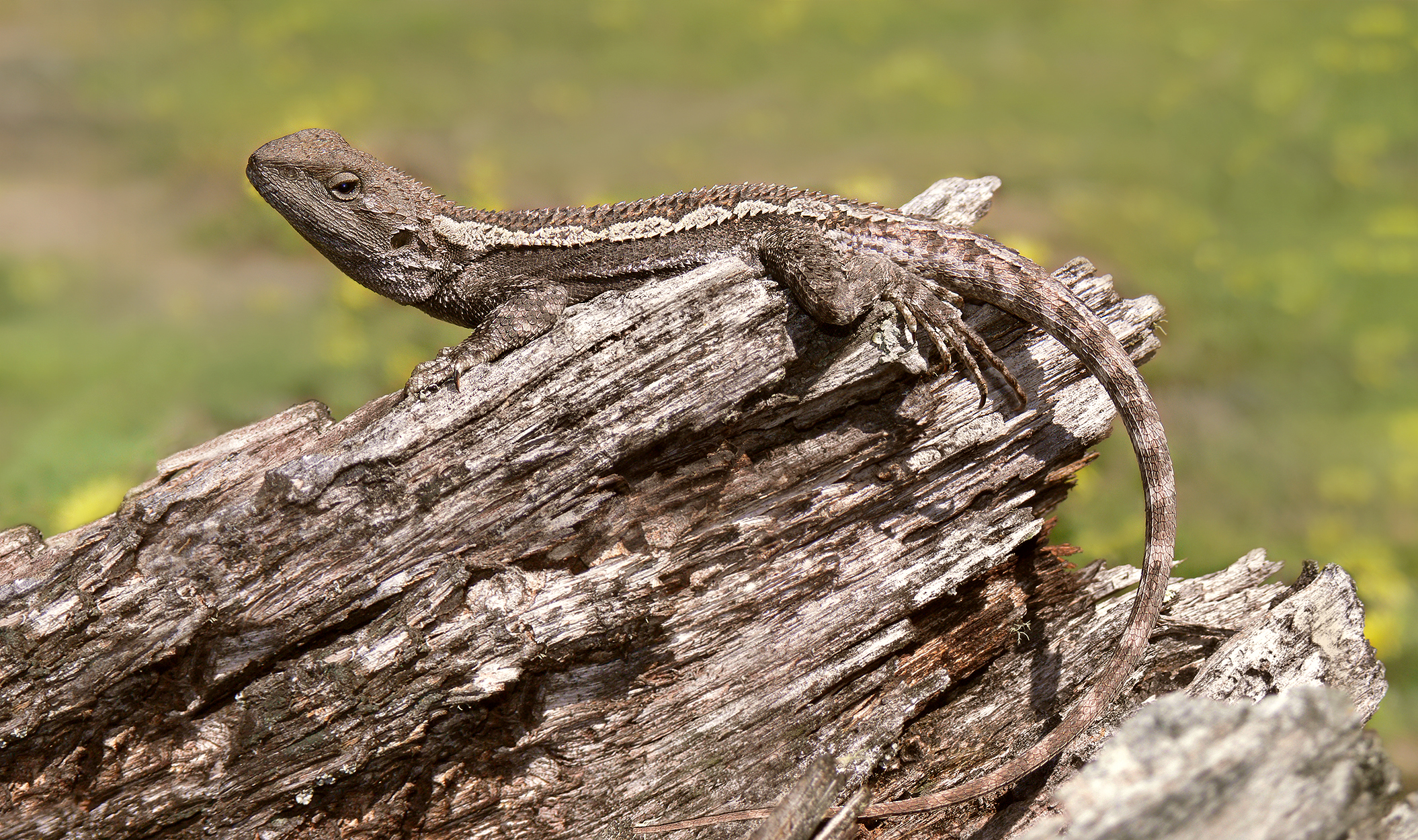

Conservation status
- Least Concern (IUCN 3.1)

Scientific classification
- Kingdom: Animalia
- Phylum: Chordata
- Class: Reptilia
- Order: Squamata
- Suborder: Iguania
- Family: Agamidae
- Genus: Amphibolurus
- Species: A. muricatus

Binomial name
- Amphibolurus muricatus (White, 1790)

= Jacky dragon =

Species of lizard

The jacky dragon (Amphibolurus muricatus) is a type of lizard native to south-eastern Australia. Other common names include blood-sucker, stonewalker, and tree dragon. It was one of the first Australian reptiles to be named by Europeans, originally described by English zoologist George Shaw in Surgeon-General John White's Journal of a Voyage to New South Wales, published in London in 1790. The lizard is well-known for its bright yellow mouth and well-developed vertebral crest, as well as the temperature-dependent sex determination of its offspring.

The Wergaia people of the Wimmera region of north-western Victoria call it nganurganity. In 2017, the star Sigma Canis Majoris was officially named "Unurgunite" (a 19th-century transcription of nganurganity), due to its identification with the jacky dragon in Wergaia traditions.

== Taxonomy ==
The jacky dragon is one of the 70 species of dragons (Agamidae) found in Australia. It is generally diurnal and tends to run in an upright posture when pursued. Common morphological characteristics include rough, nonglossy scales, broad, thick, and fleshy tongues, and well-developed limbs, especially hind limbs, which are generally longer and have five-clawed digits. Most dragons are also characterised by a lack of tail autotomy and the presence of femoral and/or preanal pores. Agamidae dragons are oviparous and tend to deposit their eggs in burrows.

== Morphology ==
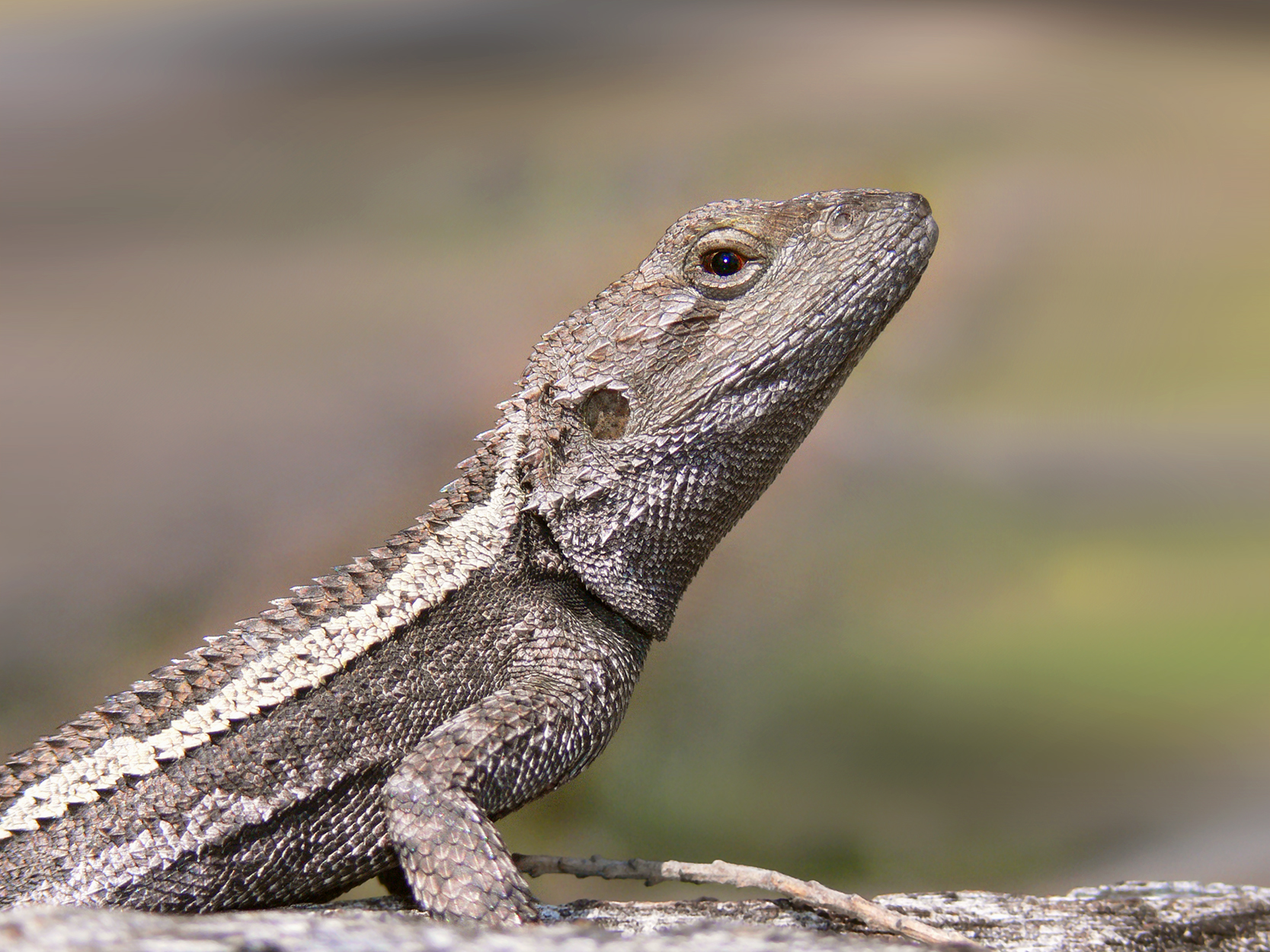
A picture of the jacky dragon taken in south-eastern Australia

The jacky dragon is pale grey to dark brown in colour, with dark patches along the middle of the back. The dark patches are interrupted by pale blotches that often blend together to form a continuous stripe from above the arm to the groin. A dark brown bar is present between the eye and the ear, but no dark stripe is present between the nostril and the eye, as in many other dragons. The lips and lower jaw tend to be of a lighter colour than the rest of the head. Jacky dragons are also characterised by a bright yellow lining in their mouths. Specimens have been seen with orange-red corners on the inside of their mouths, which may have given rise to the common name of blood-sucker.

The jacky dragon is more readily distinguishable by its five crests: a nuchal crest continuous with a vertebral series of enlarged scales, paravertebral series from the nape to the base of the tail, which is separated from the vertebral series by two or three scales, and a dorsolateral series on each side. The hind legs are covered in large, spinose scales and small, keeled scales. Jacky dragons also have spinose scales on the sides of their necks. The tympanum is medium-sized and fairly conspicuous. The average length of a jacky dragon is 230 mm (9 in), including the tail, though they have been recorded at a length of up to 445 mm (17.5 in). The tail is generally twice as long as the body. The average mass of the jacky dragon is 30 g, although the largest dragons have been recorded at around 67 g. The size of the dragons' heads can be used to differentiate between sexes, with males usually having conspicuously larger heads.

== Reproduction and life cycle ==
Gravid females are found from October until February, and they lay up to eight eggs. Clutch size tends to be positively correlated with female body size. Most adult females lay at least one clutch every summer. They tend to lay their clutches under sheets of bark or decaying vegetation over sandy deposits. The first young begin to appear at the end of December and are abundant by February. Jacky dragons are usually about 75 mm (3 in) in length immediately following hatching.

The sex of the hatchlings is determined by the temperature of the nest, a process known as temperature-dependent sex determination (TSD). The hatchlings are females in low- and high-temperature environments and males in medium-temperature environments. This causes young dragons from clutches laid earlier in the season to be predominately male. Shine suggests, however, that the sex of the hatchling is determined soon after oviposition when the mother still has considerable control over the temperature of the nest. This may falsify the hypothesis that TSD evolved in lizards so as to match the sex of the offspring with environmental conditions that may be unpredictable when the clutch is laid, as is most likely the case for turtles, tuataras, and crocodiles. In fact, recent research suggests TSD has evolved in lizards so as to ensure reproductive success in the offspring.

The jacky dragon reaches sexual maturity rapidly. Females can lay clutches within one year of hatching. The average lifespan of the jacky dragon is four years, which is significantly shorter than most lizards.

== Ecology ==
=== Distribution ===
Jacky dragons are found along the southeastern coast of Australia. They have been found as far north as central Queensland, in New South Wales, Victoria, and in the southeastern portion of South Australia.

== Habitat ==
The jacky dragon is usually found in dry sclerophyll forests and woodlands. They are present in the eastern highlands, but not in alpine areas. They are semiarboreal, and individuals are often seen perching on fallen or standing timber.

== Predators and prey ==
Insects compose most of the diet of the jacky dragon, and include flies, moths, caterpillars, grasshoppers, and small beetles.

Predators of young jacky dragons are numerous, and include small mammals, such as feral cats or rats, and other reptiles. Adults face aerial predation from birds such as kookaburras, ravens, black-shouldered kites, and nankeen kestrels. The dragons use visual cues such as the changing area over time, edge length, shape, and orientation in the recognition of aerial predators.

== Behaviour ==
Jacky dragons are very swift runners and, like many other dragons (Agamidae), will sometimes run in an almost upright position on their hind legs when pursued. In cool, wet weather, they bury themselves in the sand or shelter under a bush. They rarely enter the water, but do have the ability to swim. In a fight, opponents circle each other in an upright position with their bodies laterally compressed so as to enlarge their appearance. They tend to direct their attacks towards the tails of their opponents. Various territorial displays include tail-waving, raising or lowering their bodies, head-bobbing, arm-waving, and darkening their colour.

Jacky dragons have many different displays, or series of movements, that are used as communication between conspecifics. The push-up display, for example, begins with a series of tail flicks, backward and forward arm-waves, a push-up, and a characteristic rocking of the entire body. Those unique movements have velocity and directional characteristics that distinguish them from other environmental occurrences such as the blowing of vegetation. That is necessary because the visual system of the jacky dragon relies mostly on movement for information.

== Conservation status ==
The jacky dragon is not in danger of extinction. Its abundance, along with other common reptiles, is a result of the heterogeneity and structural complexity of the ground and groundcover of undisturbed areas, which is important in the conservation of reptiles in Australia.
