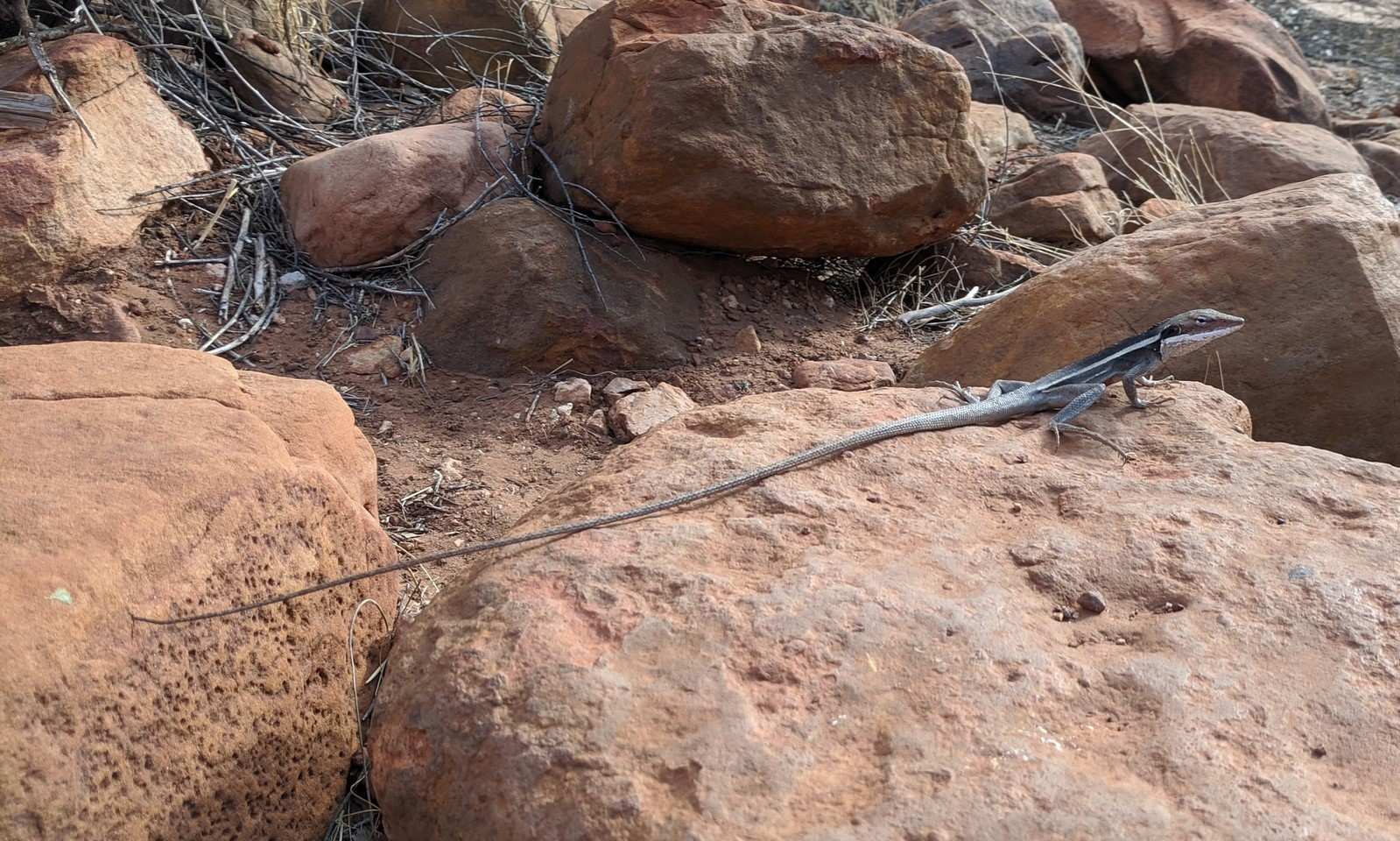

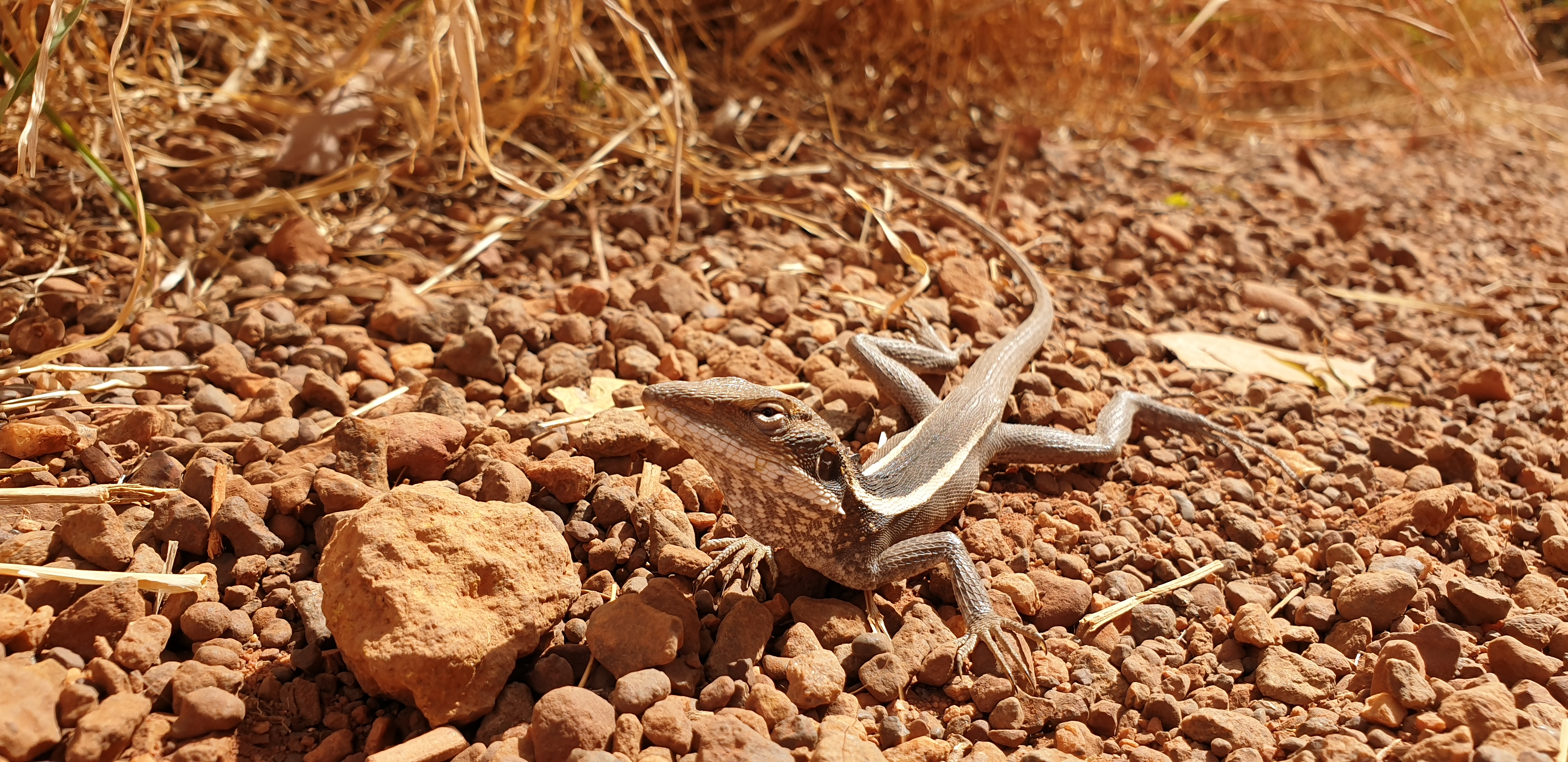

Conservation status
- Least Concern (IUCN 3.1)

Scientific classification
- Kingdom: Animalia
- Phylum: Chordata
- Class: Reptilia
- Order: Squamata
- Suborder: Iguania
- Family: Agamidae
- Subfamily: Amphibolurinae
- Genus: Gowidon; Wells & Wellington, 1983
- Species: G. longirostris

Binomial name
- Gowidon longirostris (Boulenger, 1883)

Synonyms
- Lophognathus longirostris; Physignathus longirostris; Physignathus eraduensis; Gowidon quattuorfasciatus; Amphibolurus longirostris

= Gowidon =

Genus of lizards

Gowidon is a genus of arboreal lizards in the family Agamidae. It is monotypic with a single recognised species, Gowidon longirostris, commonly known as the long-snouted lashtail or long-nosed water dragon. It is found in Northern Territory, Queensland, South Australia, Western Australia, Australia, and in New Guinea.

== Taxonomy ==
It was first described in 1883 by George Boulenger as Lophognathus longirostris, and was transferred to the genus, Gowidon, in 2014 by Hal Cogger. The taxonomic decision for synonymy is given by Cogger in 1983.
