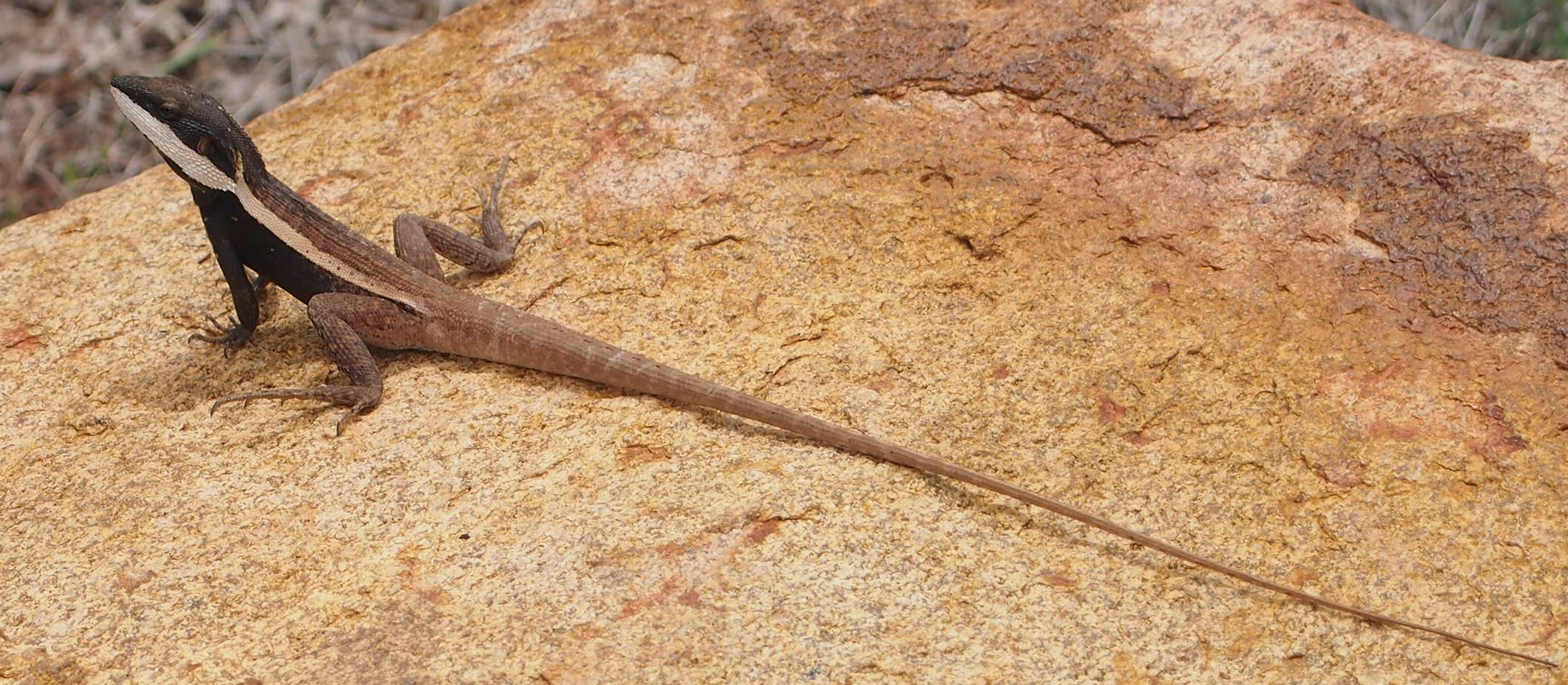

Conservation status
- Least Concern (IUCN 3.1)

Scientific classification
- Kingdom: Animalia
- Phylum: Chordata
- Class: Reptilia
- Order: Squamata
- Suborder: Iguania
- Family: Agamidae
- Genus: Lophognathus
- Species: L. gilberti

Binomial name
- Lophognathus gilberti Gray, 1842

Synonyms
- Lophognathus gilberti Gray, 1842; Redtenbachia fasciata Steindachner, 1867; Grammatophora temporalis Günther, 1867; Physignathus gilberti — Boulenger, 1885; Physignathus incognitus Ahl, 1926; Gemmatophora gilberti — Storr, 1983; Amphibolurus gilberti — Ehmann, 1992; Lophognathus gilberti — Cogger, 2000

= Lophognathus gilberti =

Species of lizard

Lophognathus gilberti, also known commonly as Gilbert's dragon, Gilbert's lashtail, or Ta-ta lizard, is a species of lizard in the family Agamidae. The species is endemic to Australia.

== Etymology ==
The specific name, gilberti, is in honor of English naturalist John Gilbert.

== Geographic range ==
L. gilberti is found in the following Australian states and territories: northern Northern Territory, northwestern Queensland, and northern Western Australia.

== Habitat ==
L. gilberti is found in a variety of habitats including coastal sand dunes, shrubland, savanna, and forest, and it has also been found in agricultural and urban areas.

== Behaviour ==
L. gilberti is terrestrial and semi-arboreal.

== Reproduction ==
L. gilberti is oviparous, and sex determination is temperature-dependent.

== Gallery ==
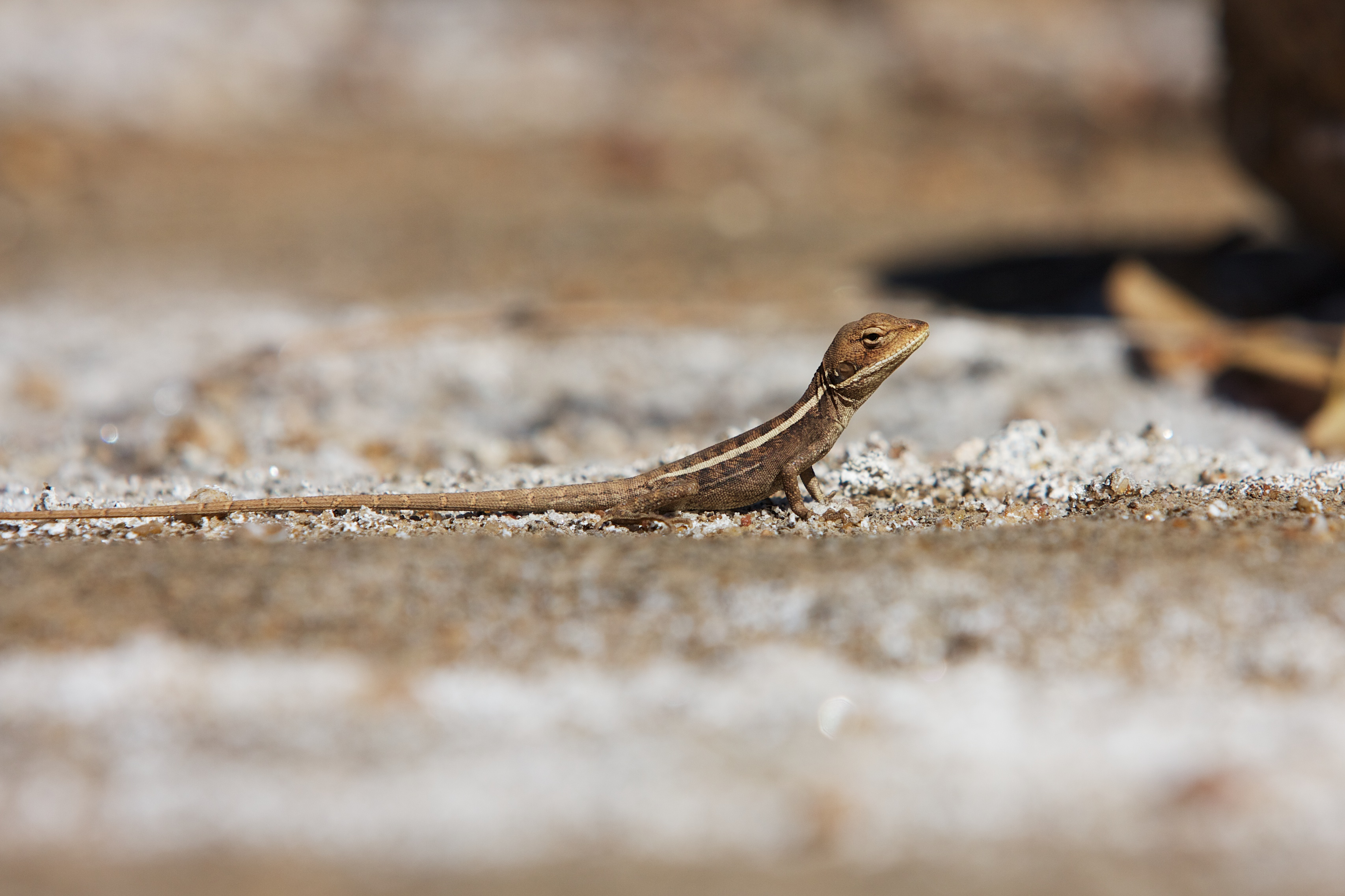

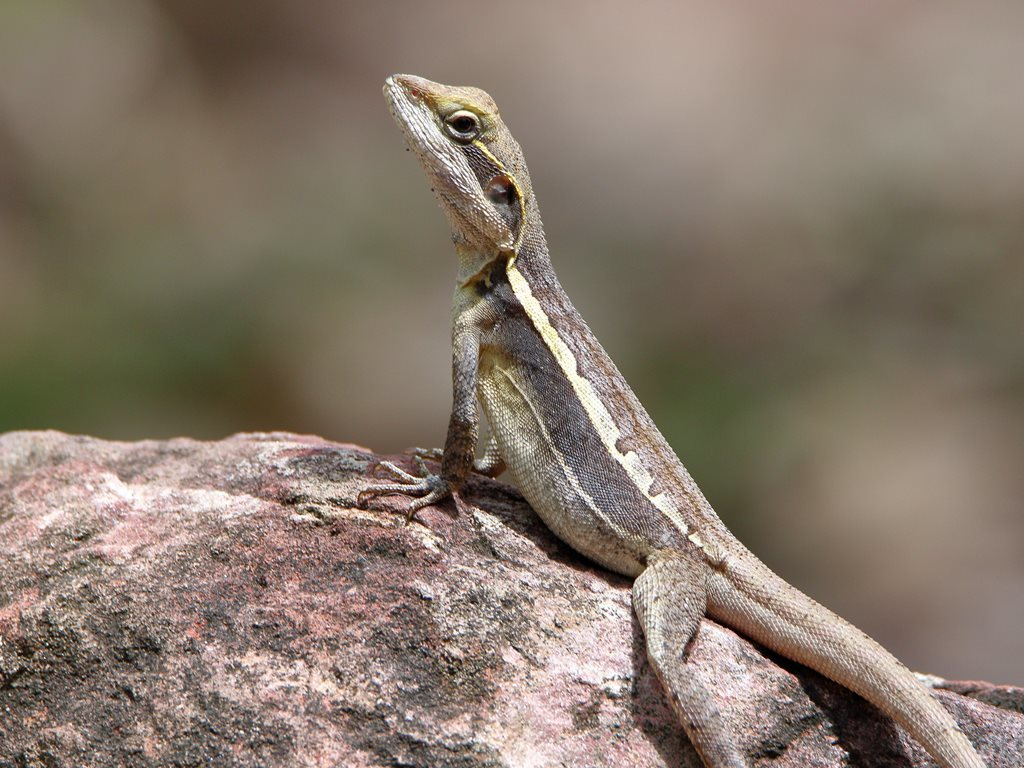
