= Snakes of Australia =

This article lists the various snakes of Australia which live in a wide variety of habitats around the country. The Australian scrub python is Australia's largest native snake.

== Victoria ==
=== North West ===
- Common copperhead, Austrelaps
- Demansia psammophis
- Masters' snake, Drysdalia mastersii
- Echiopsis curta
- Tiger snake, Notechis scutatus
- Western brown snake, Pseudonaja nuchalis
- Eastern brown snake, Pseudonaja textilis
- Simoselaps australis
- Suta nigriceps
- Suta spectabilis
- Suta suta
- Bandy-bandy, Vermicella annulata

=== South west ===
- Lowland copperhead, Austrelaps superbus
- White-lipped snake, Drysdalia coronoides
- Tiger snake, Notechis scutatus
- Red bellied black snake, Pseudechis porphyriacus
- Eastern brown snake, Pseudonaja textilis
- Suta flagellum

=== Central ===
- Lowland copperhead, Austrelaps superbus
- Tiger snake, Notechis scutatus
- Red bellied black snake, Pseudechis porphyriacus
- Eastern brown snake, Pseudonaja textilis
- Cryptophis nigrescens
- Suta flagellum
- Suta nigriceps
- Suta spectabilis
- Suta suta
- Bandy-bandy, Vermicella annulata

=== Melbourne ===
- Lowland copperhead, Austrelaps superbus
- White-lipped snake, Drysdalia coronoides
- Tiger snake, Notechis scutatus
- Red bellied black snake, Pseudechis porphyriacus
- Eastern brown snake, Pseudonaja textilis
- Cryptophis nigrescens
- Suta flagellum
- Suta spectabilis
- Bandy-bandy, Vermicella annulata

=== Gippsland ===
- Lowland copperhead, Austrelaps superbus
- White-lipped snake, Drysdalia coronoides
- Tiger snake, Notechis scutatus
- Red bellied black snake, Pseudechis porphyriacus
- Eastern brown snake, Pseudonaja textilis
- Cryptophis nigrescens
- Bandy-bandy, Vermicella annulata

== Tasmania ==
- Lowland copperhead, Austrelaps superbus
- White-lipped snake, Drysdalia coronoides
- Tiger snake, Notechis scutatus

== Northern Territory ==
=== North ===
- Black-headed python, Aspidites melanocephalus
- Liasis childreni
- Liasis fuscus
- Olive python, Liasis olivaceus
- Oenpelli python, Morelia oenpelliensis
- Morelia spilota variegata
- Boiga irregularis
- Cerberus rynchops
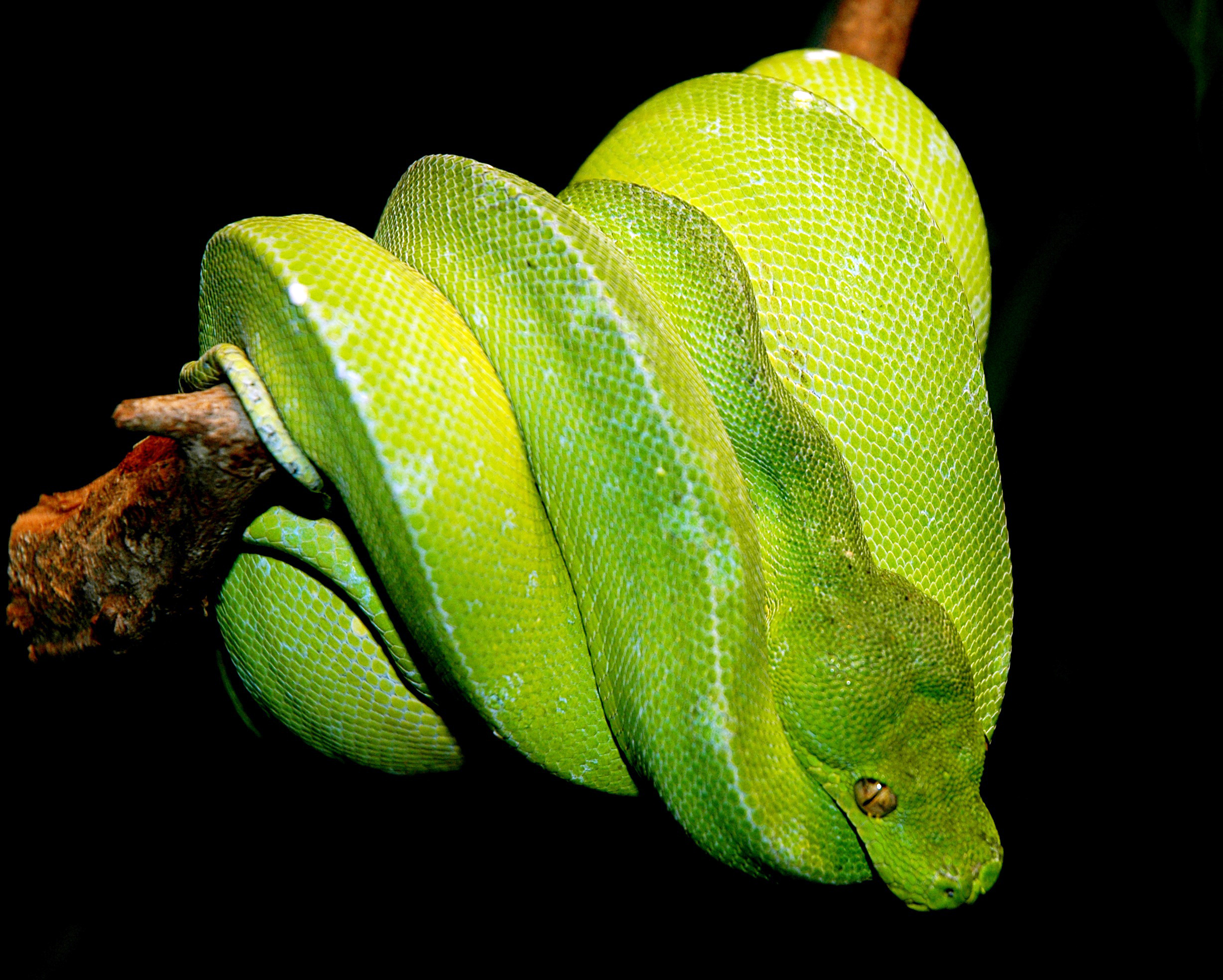
- Tree python
  Dendrelaphis punctulata
- Pseudoferania polylepis
- Fordonia leucobalia
- Myron richardsonii
- Stegonotus cucullatus
- Keelback, Tropidonophis mairii
- Common death adder, Acanthophis antarcticus
- Acanthophis praelongus
- Desert death adder, Acanthophis pyrrhus
- Demansia vestigiata
- Demansia olivacea
- Demansia papuensis
- Demansia torquata
- Orange-naped snake, Furina ornata
- Oxyuranus scutellatus
- King brown snake, Pseudechis australis
- Spotted brown snake, Pseudonaja guttata
- Ringed brown snake, Pseudonaja modesta
- Western brown snake, Pseudonaja nuchalis
- Eastern brown snake, Pseudonaja textilis
- Cryptophis pallidiceps
- Simoselaps fasciolatus
- Suta suta
- Vermicella multifasciata
- Bandy-bandy, Vermicella annulata

=== South ===
- Bandy-bandy, Vermicella annulata
- Suta suta
- Suta punctata
- Suta monachus
- Simoselaps semifasciatus
- Simoselaps fasciolatus
- Simoselaps incinctus
- Simoselaps bertholdi
- Simoselaps anomalus
- Eastern brown snake, Pseudonaja textilis
- Western brown snake, Pseudonaja nuchalis
- Ingram's brown snake, Pseudonaja ingrami
- Ringed brown snake, Pseudonaja modesta
- Spotted brown snake, Pseudonaja guttata
- Inland taipan, Oxyuranus microlepidotus
- Orange-naped snake, Furina ornata
- Demansia psammophis
- Demansia olivacea
- Desert death adder, Acanthophis pyrrhus
- Common death adder, Acanthophis antarcticus
- Morelia spilota variegata
- Morelia bredli
- Liasis stimsoni
- Olive python, Liasis olivaceus
- Liasis childreni
- Woma Python, Aspidites ramsayi
- Black-headed python, Aspidites melanocephalus

== Western Australia ==
=== Gascoyne ===
- Desert death adder, Acanthophis pyrrhus
- Demansia olivacea
- Demansia psammophis
- Orange-naped snake, Furina ornata
- Liasis perthensis
- Morelia spilota variegata
- Pseudechis australis
- Ringed brown snake, Pseudonaja modesta
- Western brown snake, Pseudonaja nuchalis
- Simoselaps anomalus
- Simoselaps approximans
- Simoselaps bertholdi
- Simoselaps fasciolatus
- Simoselaps littoralis
- Simoselaps semifasciatus
- Suta fasciata
- Suta punctata

=== Goldfields-Esperance ===
- Common death adder, Acanthophis antarcticus
- Desert death adder, Acanthophis pyrrhus
- Woma Python, Aspidites ramsayi
- Demansia psammophis
- Drysdalia coronata
- Drysdalia mastersii
- Echiopsis atriceps
- Echiopsis curta
- Orange-naped snake, Furina ornata
- Liasis stimsoni
- Morelia spilota variegata
- Notechis ater
- King brown snake, Pseudechis australis
- Spotted mulga snake, Pseudechis butleri
- Dugite, Pseudonaja affinis
- Ringed brown snake, Pseudonaja modesta
- Western brown snake, Pseudonaja nuchalis
- Cryptophis bicolor
- Simoselaps bertholdi
- Simoselaps bimaculatus
- Simoselaps fasciolatus
- Simoselaps semifasciatus
- Suta fasciata
- Suta gouldii
- Suta monachus
- Suta nigriceps
- Suta spectabilis
- Suta suta

=== Great Southern ===
- Common death adder, Acanthophis antarcticus
- Drysdalia coronata
- Echiopsis curta
- Short-nosed snake, Elapognathus minor
- Morelia spilota variegata
- Notechis ater
- Dugite, Pseudonaja affinis
- Cryptophis bicolor
- Simoselaps bertholdi
- Simoselaps bimaculatus
- Suta gouldii
- Suta nigriceps

=== Kimberley ===
- Northern death adder, Acanthophis praelongus
- Desert death adder, Acanthophis pyrrhus
- Woma Python, Aspidites ramsayi
- Boiga irregularis
- Cerberus rynchops
- Demansia olivacea
- Demansia papuensis
- Demansia psammophis
- Demansia atra
- Common tree snake, Dendrelaphis punctulata
- Fordonia leucobalia
- Orange-naped snake, Furina ornata
- Liasis childreni
- Brown water python, Liasis fuscus
- Olive python, Liasis olivaceus
- Liasis stimsoni
- Rough-scaled python, Morelia carinata
- Morelia spilota variegata
- Myron richardsonii
- Oxyuranus scutellatus
- King brown snake, Pseudechis australis
- Ringed brown snake, Pseudonaja modesta
- Western brown snake, Pseudonaja nuchalis
- Cryptophis pallidiceps
- Simoselaps anomalus
- Simoselaps minimus
- Simoselaps semifasciatus
- Suta ordensis
- Suta punctata
- Suta suta
- Keelback, Tropidonophis mairii
- Vermicella multifasciata

=== Mid West ===
- Desert death adder, Acanthophis pyrrhus
- Woma Python, Aspidites ramsayi
- Demansia psammophis
- Drysdalia coronata
- Echiopsis curta
- Orange-naped snake, Furina ornata
- Liasis stimsoni
- King brown snake, Pseudechis australis
- Spotted mulga snake, Pseudechis butleri
- Ringed brown snake, Pseudonaja modesta
- Western brown snake, Pseudonaja nuchalis
- Simoselaps bertholdi
- Simoselaps bimaculatus
- Simoselaps fasciolatus
- Simoselaps littoralis
- Simoselaps semifasciatus
- Suta fasciata
- Suta gouldii
- Suta monachus
- Bandy-bandy, Vermicella annulata

=== Peel ===
- Common death adder, Acanthophis antarcticus
- Demansia psammophis
- Drysdalia coronata
- Short-nosed snake, Elapognathus minor
- Morelia spilota variegata
- Notechis ater
- King brown snake, Pseudechis australis
- Dugite, Pseudonaja affinis
- Pseudonaja modesta
- Pseudonaja nuchalis
- Simoselaps bertholdi
- Simoselaps bimaculatus
- Simoselaps calonotus
- Simoselaps littoralis
- Simoselaps semifasciatus
- Suta gouldii

=== Perth ===
- Acanthophis antarcticus
- Demansia psammophis
- Drysdalia coronata
- Elapognathus minor
- Morelia spilota variegata
- Notechis ater
- Pseudechis australis
- Pseudonaja affinis
- Pseudonaja modesta
- Pseudonaja nuchalis
- Simoselaps bertholdi
- Simoselaps bimaculatus
- Simoselaps calonotus
- Simoselaps littoralis
- Simoselaps semifasciatus
- Suta gouldii

=== Pilbara ===
- Acanthophis pyrrhus
- Woma Python, Aspidites ramsayi
- Demansia olivacea
- Demansia psammophis
- Fordonia leucobalia
- Furina ornata
- Liasis olivaceus
- Liasis perthensis
- Liasis stimsoni
- Morelia spilota variegata
- Pseudonaja modesta
- Pseudonaja nuchalis
- Simoselaps anomalus
- Simoselaps approximans
- Simoselaps semifasciatus
- Suta fasciata
- Suta punctata
- Suta suta
- Bandy-bandy, Vermicella annulata

=== South West ===
- Drysdalia coronata
- Echiopsis curta
- Elapognathus minor
- Morelia spilota variegata
- Notechis ater
- Pseudonaja affinis
- Cryptophis bicolor
- Suta gouldii
- Suta nigriceps

=== Wheatbelt ===
- Acanthophis antarcticus
- Aspidites ramsayi
- Demansia psammophis
- Elapognathus minor
- Furina ornata
- Liasis stimsoni
- Morelia spilota variegata
- Notechis ater
- Pseudechis australis
- Pseudonaja affinis
- Pseudonaja modesta
- Pseudonaja nuchalis
- Cryptophis bicolor
- Simoselaps bertholdi
- Simoselaps calonotus
- Simoselaps fasciolatus
- Simoselaps semifasciatus
- Suta gouldii
- Suta monachus
- Suta nigriceps

== South Australia ==
=== Adelaide ===
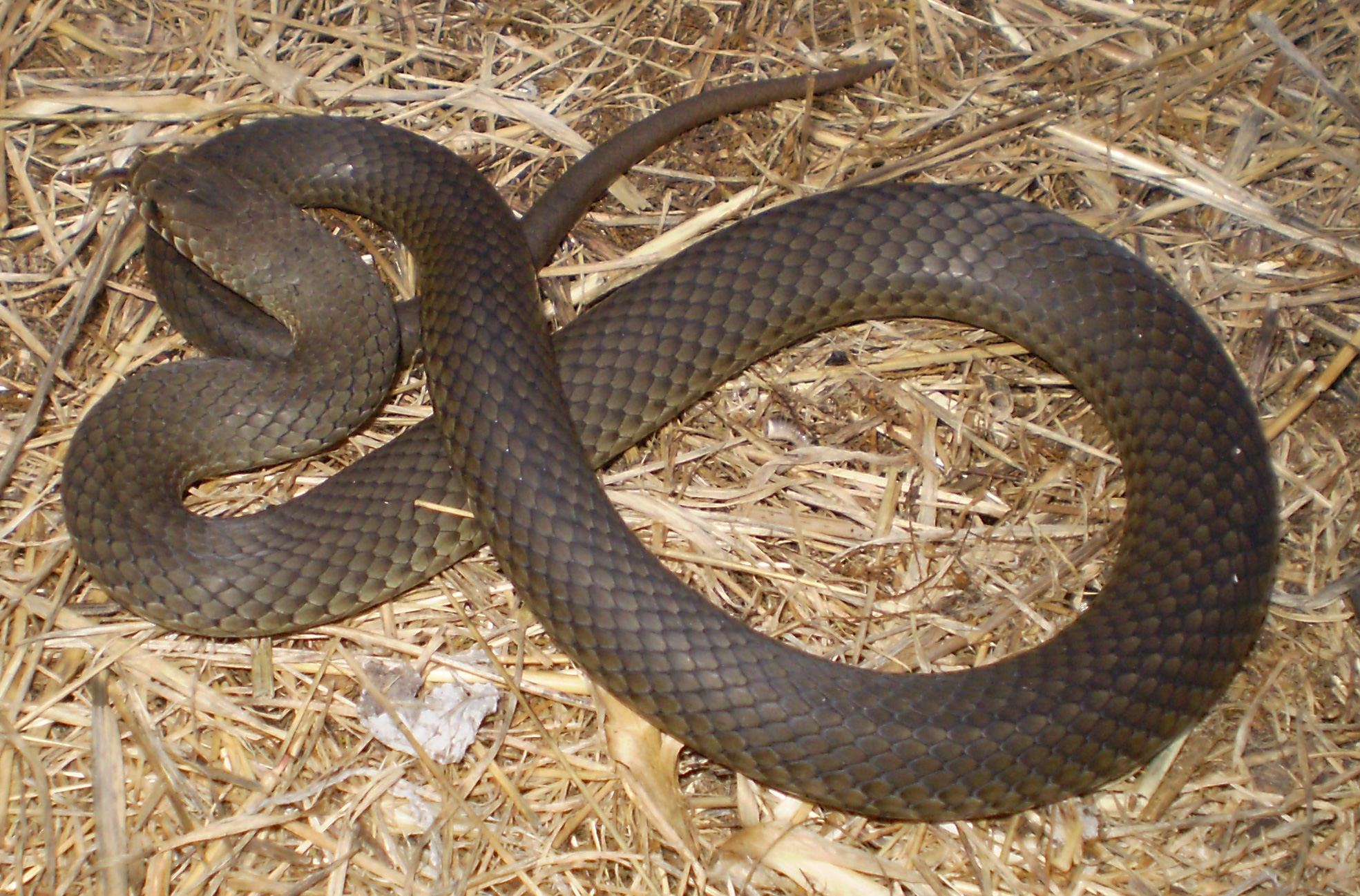
- A pygmy copperhead
  Acanthophis antarcticus
- Austrelaps superbus
- Demansia psammophis
- Notechis ater
- Notechis scutatus
- Pseudechis porphyriacus
- Pseudonaja nuchalis
- Pseudonaja textilis
- Simoselaps bertholdi
- Suta flagellum
- Suta spectabilis
- Suta suta

=== Central ===
- Acanthophis antarcticus
- Demansia psammophis
- Drysdalia mastersii
- Furina diadema
- Morelia spilota variegata
- Notechis ater
- Notechis scutatus
- Pseudechis australis
- Pseudonaja nuchalis
- Pseudonaja textilis
- Simoselaps australis
- Simoselaps bertholdi
- Suta nigriceps
- Suta spectabilis
- Suta suta
- Bandy-bandy, Vermicella annulata

=== Eyre Peninsula ===
- Acanthophis antarcticus
- Demansia psammophis
- Drysdalia mastersii
- Echiopsis curta
- Morelia spilota variegata
- Notechis ater
- Notechis scutatus
- Pseudechis australis
- Pseudonaja affinis
- Pseudonaja nuchalis
- Pseudonaja textilis
- Simoselaps bertholdi
- Simoselaps bimaculatus
- Simoselaps fasciolatus
- Suta nigriceps
- Suta spectabilis
- Suta suta
- Bandy-bandy, Vermicella annulata

=== Murray & Mallee ===
- Demansia psammophis
- Drysdalia mastersii
- Echiopsis curta
- Morelia spilota variegata
- Notechis ater
- Notechis scutatus
- Pseudechis porphyriacus
- Pseudonaja nuchalis
- Pseudonaja textilis
- Simoselaps australis
- Suta flagellum
- Suta nigriceps
- Suta spectabilis
- Suta suta
- Bandy-bandy, Vermicella annulata

=== Outback ===
- Acanthophis antarcticus
- Acanthophis pyrrhus
- Aspidites ramsayi
- Demansia psammophis
- Drysdalia mastersii
- Echiopsis curta
- Furina diadema
- Furina ornata
- Liasis stimsoni
- Morelia spilota variegata
- Oxyuranus microlepidotus
- Pseudechis australis
- Pseudonaja affinis
- Pseudonaja guttata
- Pseudonaja modesta
- Pseudonaja nuchalis
- Pseudonaja textilis
- Simoselaps anomalus
- Simoselaps australis
- Simoselaps bertholdi
- Simoselaps bimaculatus
- Simoselaps fasciolatus
- Simoselaps semifasciatus
- Suta monachus
- Suta nigriceps
- Suta spectabilis
- Suta suta
- Bandy-bandy, Vermicella annulata

=== South East ===
- Austrelaps superbus
- Drysdalia coronoides
- Drysdalia mastersii
- Echiopsis curta
- Notechis ater
- Notechis scutatus
- Pseudonaja textilis
- Simoselaps australis
- Suta flagellum
- Suta nigriceps

=== Southern & Hills ===
- Acanthophis antarcticus
- Austrelaps superbus
- Demansia psammophis
- Notechis ater
- Notechis scutatus
- Pseudechis porphyriacus
- Pseudonaja nuchalis
- Pseudonaja textilis
- Suta flagellum
- Suta spectabilis
- Suta suta

== Queensland ==
=== Brisbane ===
- Acanthophis antarcticus
- Boiga irregularis
- Cacophis harriettae
- Cacophis krefftii
- Cacophis squamulosus
- Demansia psammophis
- Dendrelaphis punctulata
- Furina diadema
- Hemiaspis signata
- Hoplocephalus bitorquatus
- Hoplocephalus stephensii
- Liasis maculosus
- Morelia spilota variegata
- Notechis scutatus
- Oxyuranus scutellatus
- Pseudechis australis
- Pseudechis guttatus
- Pseudechis porphyriacus
- Pseudonaja textilis
- Cryptophis nigrescens
- Simoselaps australis
- Tropidechis carinatus
- Tropidonophis mairii
- Bandy-bandy, Vermicella annulata

=== Central West ===
- Acanthophis antarcticus
- Acanthophis praelongus
- Aspidites ramsayi
- Aspidites melanocephalus
- Demansia olivacea
- Demansia psammophis
- Demansia torquata
- Denisonia devisi
- Denisonia maculata
- Furina barnardi
- Furina diadema
- Furina dunmalli
- Furina ornata
- Hemiaspis damelii
- Hoplocephalus bitorquatus
- Liasis olivaceus
- Liasis stimsoni
- Morelia spilota variegata
- Oxyuranus microlepidotus
- Pseudechis australis
- Pseudechis colletti
- Pseudonaja guttata
- Pseudonaja ingrami
- Pseudonaja modesta
- Pseudonaja nuchalis
- Pseudonaja textilis
- Cryptophis boschmai
- Simoselaps australis
- Simoselaps fasciolatus
- Simoselaps incinctus
- Simoselaps semifasciatus
- Suta punctata
- Suta suta
- Bandy-bandy, Vermicella annulata

=== Far North ===
- Acanthophis antarcticus
- Acanthophis praelongus
- Antaioserpens warro
- Aspidites melanocephalus
- Boiga irregularis
- Cacophis harriettae
- Cacophis squamulosus
- Cerberus rynchops
- Chondropython viridis
- Cryptophis boschmai
- Cryptophis nigrescens
- Cryptophis nigrostriatus
- Demansia papuensis
- Demansia psammophis
- Demansia torquata
- Demansia atra
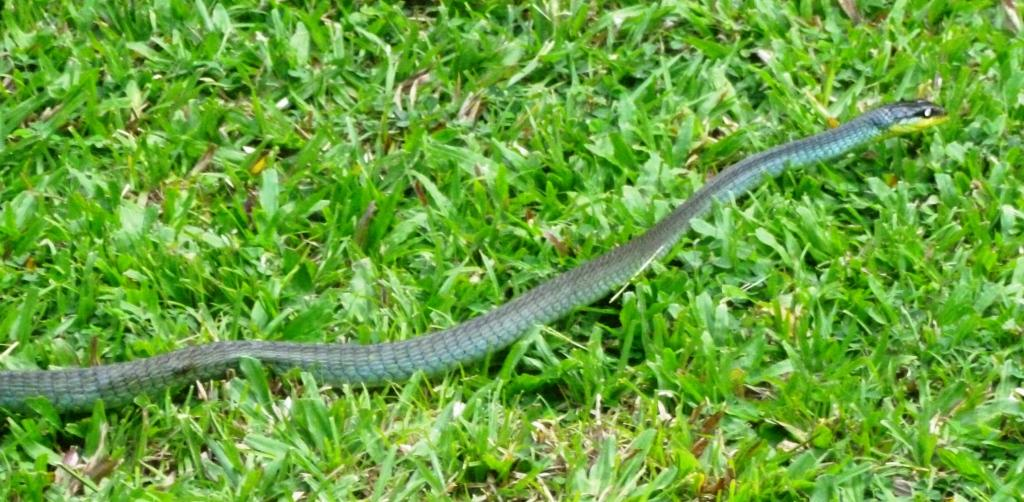
- Northern tree snake
  Dendrelaphis calligastra
- Dendrelaphis punctulata
- Fordonia leucobalia
- Furina barnardi
- Furina ornata
- Furina tristis
- Hemiaspis signata
- Hoplocephalus bitorquatus
- Liasis albertisii
- Liasis childreni
- Liasis fuscus
- Liasis maculosus
- Liasis olivaceus
- Liasis stimsoni
- Morelia amethistina
- Morelia spilota variegata
- Oxyuranus scutellatus
- Pseudechis australis
- Pseudechis porphyriacus
- Pseudoferania polylepis
- Pseudonaja nuchalis
- Pseudonaja textilis
- Simoselaps semifasciatus
- Stegonotus cucullatus
- Suta suta
- Tropidechis carinatus
- Tropidonophis mairii
- Bandy-bandy, Vermicella annulata

=== Gold Coast ===
- Acanthophis antarcticus
- Aspidites ramsayi
- Boiga irregularis
- Cacophis harriettae
- Cacophis squamulosus
- Demansia psammophis
- Demansia vestigiata
- Dendrelaphis punctulata
- Furina diadema
- Furina dunmalli
- Hemiaspis signata
- Hoplocephalus bitorquatus
- Liasis maculosus
- Morelia spilota variegata
- Notechis scutatus
- Oxyuranus scutellatus
- Pseudechis australis
- Pseudechis guttatus
- Pseudechis porphyriacus
- Pseudonaja nuchalis
- Pseudonaja textilis
- Cryptophis boschmai
- Cryptophis nigrescens
- Cryptophis nigrostriatus
- Tropidonophis mairii
- Bandy-bandy, Vermicella annulata

=== North West ===
- Acanthophis antarcticus
- Acanthophis praelongus
- Aspidites melanocephalus
- Boiga irregularis
- Cerberus rynchops
- Demansia olivacea
- Demansia papuensis
- Demansia psammophis
- Demansia torquata
- Demansia vestigiata
- Dendrelaphis punctulata
- Denisonia devisi
- Pseudoferania polylepis
- Fordonia leucobalia
- Furina ornata
- Liasis childreni
- Liasis fuscus
- Liasis olivaceus
- Liasis stimsoni
- Morelia spilota variegata
- Oxyuranus scutellatus
- Pseudechis australis
- Pseudechis colletti
- Pseudonaja guttata
- Pseudonaja ingrami
- Pseudonaja modesta
- Pseudonaja nuchalis
- Pseudonaja textilis
- Cryptophis boschmai
- Simoselaps incinctus
- Simoselaps semifasciatus
- Stegonotus cucullatus
- Suta punctata
- Suta suta
- Tropidonophis mairii
- Bandy-bandy, Vermicella annulata

=== Rockhampton ===
- Acanthophis antarcticus
- Aspidites melanocephalus
- Boiga irregularis
- Cacophis harriettae
- Cacophis squamulosus
- Demansia psammophis
- Demansia torquata
- Demansia vestigiata
- Dendrelaphis punctulata
- Denisonia maculata
- Furina diadema
- Furina ornata
- Hemiaspis damelii
- Hemiaspis signata
- Hoplocephalus bitorquatus
- Liasis maculosus
- Morelia spilota variegata
- Oxyuranus scutellatus
- Pseudechis australis
- Pseudechis guttatus
- Pseudechis porphyriacus
- Pseudonaja textilis
- Cryptophis boschmai
- Cryptophis nigrescens
- Cryptophis nigrostriatus
- Simoselaps australis
- Suta suta
- Tropidonophis mairii
- Bandy-bandy, Vermicella annulata

=== Mackay ===
- Aspidites melanocephalus
- Boiga irregularis
- Cacophis harriettae
- Cacophis squamulosus
- Demansia psammophis
- Demansia torquata
- Demansia vestigiata
- Dendrelaphis punctulata
- Denisonia devisi
- Furina barnardi
- Furina diadema
- Furina ornata
- Hemiaspis signata
- Hoplocephalus bitorquatus
- Liasis maculosus
- Morelia spilota variegata
- Oxyuranus scutellatus
- Pseudechis australis
- Pseudechis porphyriacus
- Pseudonaja guttata
- Pseudonaja textilis
- Cryptophis boschmai
- Cryptophis nigrescens
- Cryptophis nigrostriatus
- Simoselaps australis
- Simoselaps semifasciatus
- Antaioserpens warro
- Suta suta
- Tropidonophis mairii
- Bandy-bandy, Vermicella annulata

=== South East ===
- Acanthophis antarcticus
- Aspidites ramsayi
- Boiga irregularis
- Cacophis harriettae
- Cacophis squamulosus
- Demansia psammophis
- Demansia vestigiata
- Dendrelaphis punctulata
- Furina diadema
- Furina dunmalli
- Hemiaspis signata
- Hoplocephalus bitorquatus
- Liasis maculosus
- Morelia spilota variegata
- Notechis scutatus
- Oxyuranus scutellatus
- Pseudechis australis
- Pseudechis guttatus
- Pseudechis porphyriacus
- Pseudonaja nuchalis
- Pseudonaja textilis
- Cryptophis boschmai
- Cryptophis nigrescens
- Cryptophis nigrostriatus
- Tropidonophis mairii
- Bandy-bandy, Vermicella annulata

=== South West ===
- Acanthophis antarcticus
- Acanthophis pyrrhus
- Aspidites ramsayi
- Aspidites melanocephalus
- Demansia psammophis
- Demansia torquata
- Denisonia devisi
- Furina diadema
- Furina dunmalli
- Furina ornata
- Hemiaspis damelii
- Hoplocephalus bitorquatus
- Liasis maculosus
- Liasis stimsoni
- Morelia spilota variegata
- Notechis scutatus
- Oxyuranus microlepidotus
- Pseudechis australis
- Pseudechis colletti
- Pseudechis guttatus
- Pseudechis porphyriacus
- Pseudonaja guttata
- Pseudonaja ingrami
- Pseudonaja modesta
- Pseudonaja nuchalis
- Pseudonaja textilis
- Cryptophis boschmai
- Cryptophis nigrescens
- Simoselaps australis
- Simoselaps fasciolatus
- Suta spectabilis
- Suta suta
- Bandy-bandy, Vermicella annulata

=== Sunshine Coast ===
- Acanthophis antarcticus
- Boiga irregularis
- Cacophis harriettae
- Cacophis squamulosus
- Demansia psammophis
- Demansia vestigiata
- Dendrelaphis punctulata
- Furina diadema
- Hemiaspis signata
- Hoplocephalus bitorquatus
- Liasis maculosus
- Morelia spilota mcdowelli
- Notechis scutatus
- Oxyuranus scutellatus
- Pseudechis porphyriacus
- Pseudonaja textilis
- Cryptophis boschmai
- Cryptophis nigrescens
- Cryptophis nigrostriatus
- Tropidonophis mairii
- Bandy-bandy, Vermicella annulata

=== Townsville ===
- Acanthophis antarcticus
- Acanthophis praelongus
- Aspidites melanocephalus
- Boiga irregularis
- Cacophis harriettae
- Cacophis krefftii
- Cacophis squamulosus
- Demansia psammophis
- Demansia torquata
- Demansia vestigiata
- Dendrelaphis punctulata
- Pseudoferania polylepis
- Furina barnardi
- Furina diadema
- Furina ornata
- Hemiaspis signata
- Hoplocephalus bitorquatus
- Liasis fuscus
- Liasis maculosus
- Morelia spilota variegata
- Oxyuranus scutellatus
- Pseudechis australis
- Pseudechis porphyriacus
- Pseudonaja textilis
- Cryptophis boschmai
- Cryptophis nigrescens
- Cryptophis nigrostriatus
- Simoselaps australis
- Simoselaps semifasciatus
- Suta suta
- Tropidonophis mairii
- Bandy-bandy, Vermicella annulata

=== Wide Bay ===
- Acanthophis antarcticus
- Aspidites ramsayi
- Boiga irregularis
- Cacophis harriettae
- Cacophis squamulosus
- Demansia psammophis
- Demansia vestigiata
- Dendrelaphis punctulata
- Furina diadema
- Furina dunmalli
- Hemiaspis signata
- Hoplocephalus bitorquatus
- Liasis maculosus
- Morelia spilota variegata
- Notechis scutatus
- Oxyuranus scutellatus
- Pseudechis australis
- Pseudechis guttatus
- Pseudechis porphyriacus
- Pseudonaja nuchalis
- Pseudonaja textilis
- Cryptophis boschmai
- Cryptophis nigrescens
- Cryptophis nigrostriatus
- Tropidonophis mairii
- Bandy-bandy, Vermicella annulata

== NSW & ACT ==
=== Central Coast ===
- Acanthophis antarcticus
- Austrelaps ramsayi
- Boiga irregularis
- Cacophis krefftii
- Cacophis squamulosus
- Demansia psammophis
- Dendrelaphis punctulata
- Drysdalia coronoides
- Drysdalia rhodogaster
- Furina diadema
- Hemiaspis signata
- Hoplocephalus bitorquatus
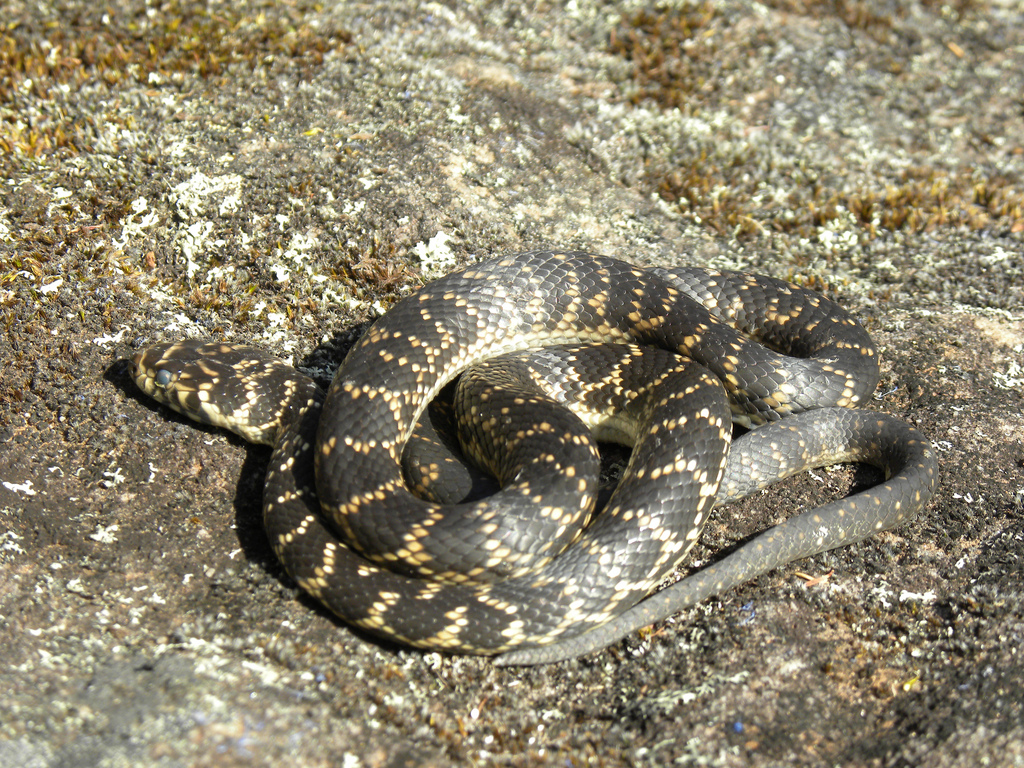
- Broad-headed snake
  Hoplocephalus bungaroides
- Hoplocephalus stephensii
- Morelia spilota spilota
- Notechis scutatus
- Pseudechis porphyriacus
- Pseudonaja textilis
- Cryptophis nigrescens
- Suta spectabilis
- Bandy-bandy, Vermicella annulata

=== Central West ===
- Austrelaps ramsayi
- Demansia psammophis
- Dendrelaphis punctulata
- Drysdalia coronoides
- Furina diadema
- Hoplocephalus bungaroides
- Morelia spilota variegata
- Notechis scutatus
- Pseudechis australis
- Pseudechis guttatus
- Pseudechis porphyriacus
- Pseudonaja nuchalis
- Pseudonaja textilis
- Cryptophis nigrescens
- Simoselaps australis
- Suta flagellum
- Suta gouldii
- Suta nigriceps
- Suta suta
- Bandy-bandy, Vermicella annulata

=== Far West ===
- Aspidites ramsayi
- Demansia psammophis
- Demansia torquata
- Furina diadema
- Liasis stimsoni
- Morelia spilota variegata
- Pseudechis australis
- Pseudechis porphyriacus
- Pseudonaja modesta
- Pseudonaja textilis
- Simoselaps australis
- Simoselaps fasciolatus
- Suta spectabilis
- Suta suta
- Bandy-bandy, Vermicella annulata

=== Hunter ===
- Acanthophis antarcticus
- Austrelaps ramsayi
- Boiga irregularis
- Cacophis krefftii
- Cacophis squamulosus
- Demansia psammophis
- Dendrelaphis punctulata
- Drysdalia coronoides
- Furina diadema
- Hemiaspis signata
- Hoplocephalus bitorquatus
- Hoplocephalus stephensii
- Morelia spilota spilota
- Notechis scutatus
- Pseudechis guttatus
- Pseudechis porphyriacus
- Pseudonaja textilis
- Cryptophis nigrescens
- Suta spectabilis
- Suta suta
- Tropidechis carinatus
- Bandy-bandy, Vermicella annulata

=== Illawarra ===
- Acanthophis antarcticus
- Austrelaps ramsayi
- Cacophis squamulosus
- Demansia psammophis
- Drysdalia coronoides
- Drysdalia rhodogaster
- Furina diadema
- Hemiaspis signata
- Hoplocephalus bungaroides
- Morelia spilota spilota
- Notechis scutatus
- Pseudechis porphyriacus
- Pseudonaja textilis
- Cryptophis nigrescens
- Suta spectabilis
- Bandy-bandy, Vermicella annulata

=== Mid North Coast ===
- Acanthophis antarcticus
- Austrelaps ramsayi
- Boiga irregularis
- Cacophis krefftii
- Cacophis squamulosus
- Demansia psammophis
- Dendrelaphis punctulata
- Drysdalia coronoides
- Furina diadema
- Hemiaspis signata
- Hoplocephalus bitorquatus
- Hoplocephalus stephensii
- Morelia spilota variegata
- Notechis scutatus
- Pseudechis guttatus
- Pseudechis porphyriacus
- Pseudonaja textilis
- Cryptophis nigrescens
- Suta suta
- Tropidechis carinatus
- Bandy-bandy, Vermicella annulata

=== Murray ===
- Austrelaps ramsayi
- Demansia psammophis
- Drysdalia coronoides
- Echiopsis curta
- Hemiaspis damelii
- Morelia spilota variegata
- Notechis scutatus
- Oxyuranus microlepidotus
- Pseudechis australis
- Pseudechis porphyriacus
- Pseudonaja nuchalis
- Pseudonaja textilis
- Cryptophis nigrescens
- Simoselaps australis
- Suta nigriceps
- Suta spectabilis
- Suta suta
- Bandy-bandy, Vermicella annulata

=== Murrumbidgee ===
- Acanthophis antarcticus
- Demansia psammophis
- Morelia spilota variegata
- Notechis scutatus
- Pseudechis australis
- Pseudechis porphyriacus
- Pseudonaja nuchalis
- Pseudonaja textilis
- Simoselaps australis
- Suta spectabilis
- Suta suta
- Bandy-bandy, Vermicella annulata

=== North Western ===
- Acanthophis antarcticus
- Aspidites ramsayi
- Demansia psammophis
- Dendrelaphis punctulata
- Denisonia devisi
- Furina diadema
- Hemiaspis damelii
- Hoplocephalus bitorquatus
- Morelia spilota variegata
- Oxyuranus microlepidotus
- Pseudechis australis
- Pseudechis guttatus
- Pseudechis porphyriacus
- Pseudonaja modesta
- Pseudonaja nuchalis
- Pseudonaja textilis
- Simoselaps australis
- Simoselaps fasciolatus
- Suta nigriceps
- Suta spectabilis
- Suta suta
- Bandy-bandy, Vermicella annulata

=== Northern Rivers ===
Red-bellied black snake in Kowmung River, New South Wales

- Acanthophis antarcticus
- Boiga irregularis
- Cacophis harriettae
- Cacophis krefftii
- Cacophis squamulosus
- Demansia psammophis
- Dendrelaphis punctulata
- Furina diadema
- Hemiaspis signata
- Hoplocephalus bitorquatus
- Hoplocephalus stephensii
- Liasis maculosus
- Morelia spilota variegata
- Notechis scutatus
- Pseudechis porphyriacus
- Pseudonaja textilis
- Cryptophis nigrescens
- Simoselaps australis
- Tropidechis carinatus
- Tropidonophis mairii
- Bandy-bandy, Vermicella annulata

=== Northern Tablelands ===
- Liasis maculosus
- Morelia spilota variegata
- Boiga irregularis
- Dendrelaphis punctulata
- Acanthophis antarcticus
- Austrelaps ramsayi
- Cacophis krefftii
- Cacophis squamulosus
- Demansia psammophis
- Denisonia devisi
- Drysdalia coronoides
- Furina diadema
- Furina dunmalli
- Hemiaspis damelii
- Hemiaspis signata
- Hoplocephalus bitorquatus
- Notechis scutatus
- Pseudechis australis
- Pseudechis porphyriacus
- Pseudechis guttatus
- Pseudonaja nuchalis
- Pseudonaja textilis
- Cryptophis nigrescens
- Simoselaps australis
- Suta suta
- Bandy-bandy, Vermicella annulata
- Tropidechis carinatus

=== South Coast ===
- Acanthophis antarcticus
- Austrelaps ramsayi
- Drysdalia coronoides
- Drysdalia rhodogaster
- Morelia spilota spilota
- Notechis scutatus
- Pseudechis porphyriacus
- Pseudonaja textilis
- Cryptophis nigrescens
- Suta flagellum

=== South East ===
- Acanthophis antarcticus
- Austrelaps ramsayi
- Cacophis squamulosus
- Demansia psammophis
- Drysdalia coronoides
- Drysdalia rhodogaster
- Furina diadema
- Morelia spilota variegata
- Notechis scutatus
- Pseudechis porphyriacus
- Pseudonaja textilis
- Cryptophis nigrescens
- Suta flagellum
- Suta spectabilis
- Suta suta
- Bandy-bandy, Vermicella annulata

=== Sydney ===
- Acanthophis antarcticus
- Austrelaps ramsayi
- Austrelaps superbus
- Boiga irregularis
- Cacophis krefftii
- Cacophis squamulosus
- Demansia psammophis
- Dendrelaphis punctulatus
- Drysdalia coronoides
- Drysdalia rhodogaster
- Furina diadema
- Hemiaspis signata
- Hoplocephalus bitorquatus
- Hoplocephalus bungaroides
- Hoplocephalus stephensii
- Morelia spilota spilota
- Morelia spilota variegata
- Notechis scutatus
- Pseudechis porphyriacus
- Pseudonaja textilis
