= Black-striped snake =

Black-striped snake may refer to:

- The genus Coniophanes
- Cryptophis nigrostriatus
- Neelaps calonotus
- Coniophanes imperialis
