= Australian snake habitats =

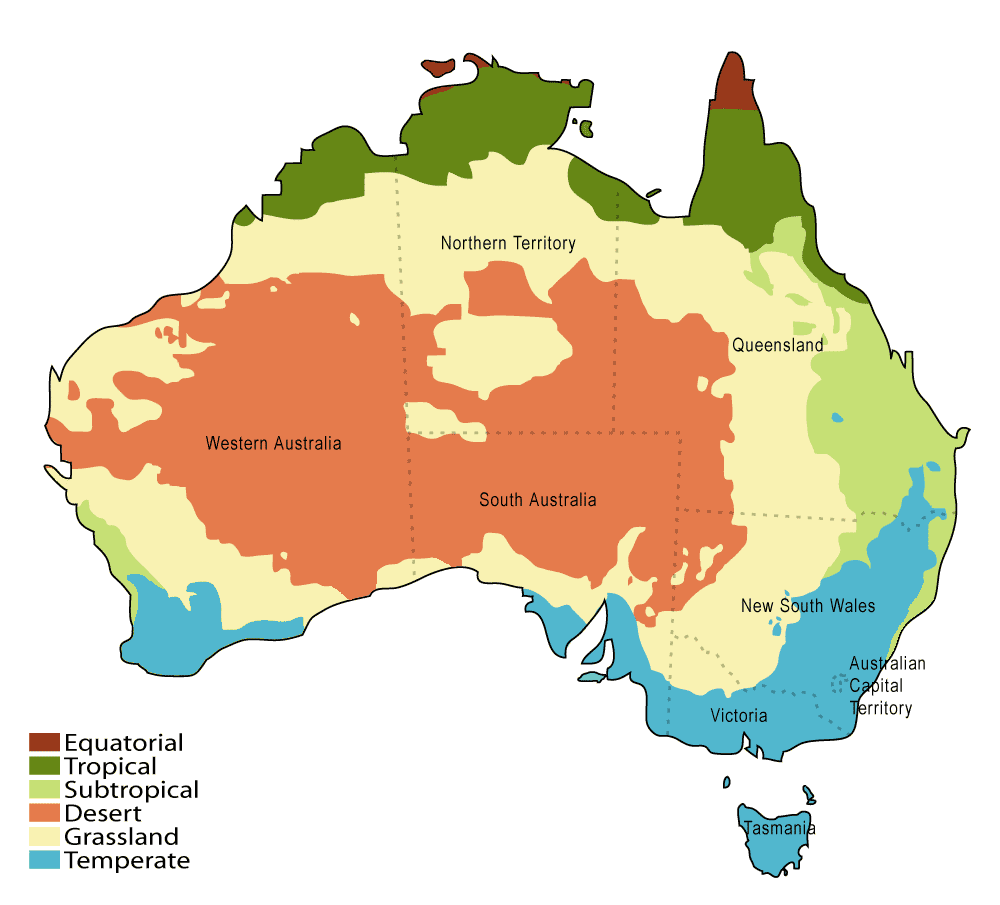
Australian habitat zones

Australia's landmass is 7,617,930 square kilometres. Due to the country's large landmass, many climates are experienced including equatorial, tropical, subtropical, desert, monsoonal, temperate, and alpine. These differing climates influence Australia's snake distribution and abundance, and provide many different and unique habitats for them.

== Western Australia ==
80% of Western Australia falls into the desert or semi-arid climate section meaning that it receives no more than a foot of rainfall all year long. The soil is not rich in nutrients and over half of the days are sunny with no clouds. There is a large variety of snakes in this area. The highest temperature ever recorded here is 123 degrees Fahrenheit (50.6 Celsius) and averages are in the 80's (F) and 90's (F) (20's and 30's Celsius) during more than half of the year. Because of these hot temperature the snake habitats in Western Australia are mostly out in the open. They enjoy soaking up the sun since they are ectothermic (cold-blooded) poikilotherms, meaning they depend upon external sources to stay warm and their body temperature can vary considerably. Habitats are typically on top of rocks or out on the desert sand area that cover most of the state. Several species of snakes can also be found in the grassy expanses surrounding wetlands and lakes in the wetter south west region of the state.

== Northern Territory ==
The Northern Territory is located to the northeast of Western Australia. Here the climate ranges from desert to tropical. This wide climate variety is accompanied by a wide variety of snakes making use of the different habitats. The highest recorded temperature in this region is 48.3 degrees Celsius and averages are around 26 degrees Celsius year round. The further south in the province you go the cooler it is, and record lows such as –7.5 degrees Celsius have been recorded in the arid inland desert.

MacLeay's water snake is a largely nocturnal species that is typically found in coastal Northern Territory. The water snakes spend most of their time in or near water where they feed; they will only leave to bask in the sun or breed. They are found mostly in freshwater lagoons, swamps and creeks and can also be found sheltering in vegetation near water. Their range increases markedly during wet season flooding. Their most defining characteristic is their stout bodies and strongly keeled scales. In terms of breeding, water snakes are viviparous which means that they give birth to up to 15 live offspring instead of laying eggs. They are a mildly venomous species with rear-facing fangs.

== Queensland ==
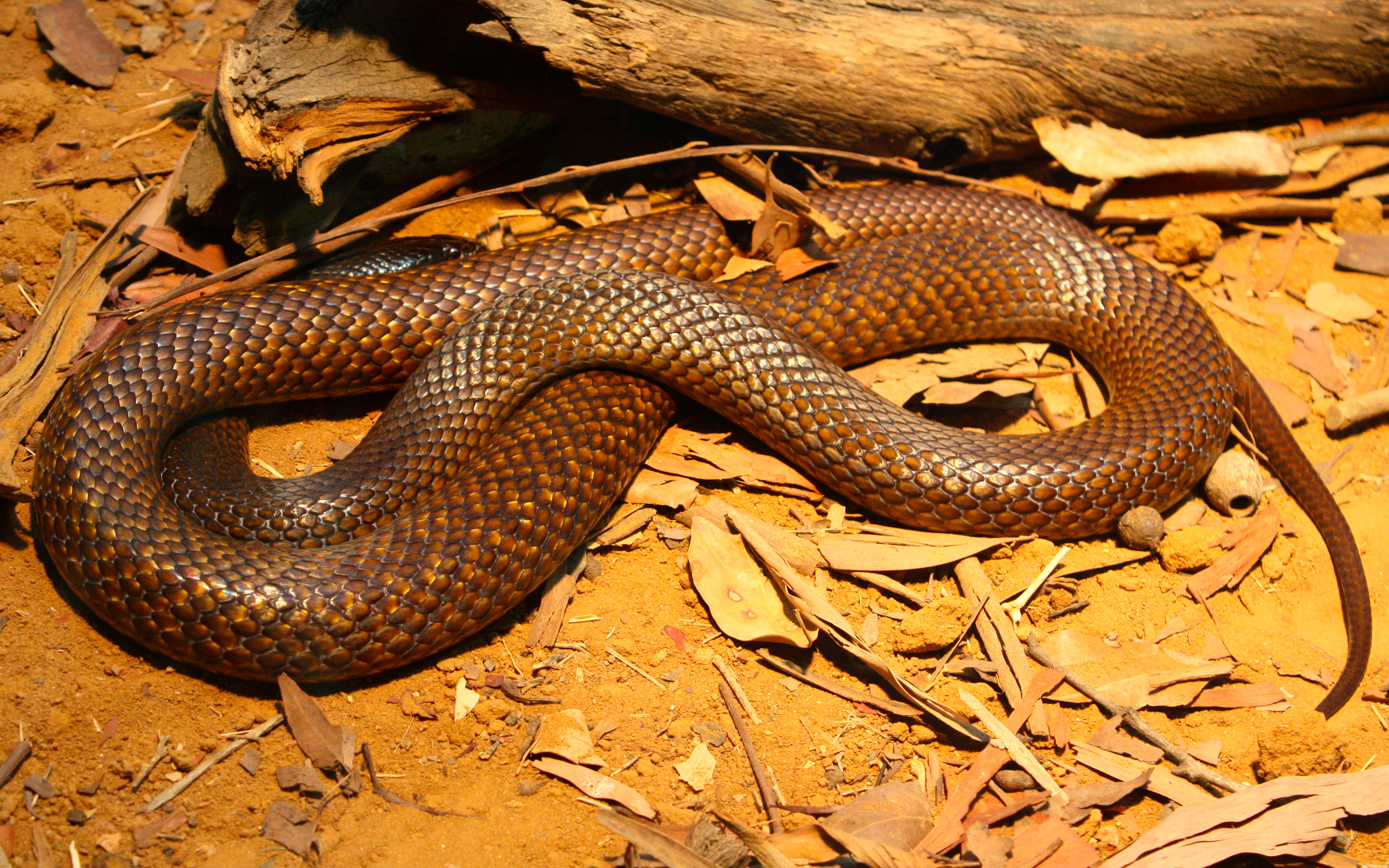
Western brown snake

Located on the east coast, Queensland is the second largest state and has a wide range of climates due to its vast size. The coastal area is very humid and warm year round with the dry season being in the winter. The inland section of the state is dominated by grassland. The majority of the snakes found in Queensland are in the north of the state where there is tropical rainforest, which provides dense vegetation for the snakes to shelter in, and a wide variety of forest animals for them to prey upon. Snakes also inhabit natural caves and soft soil near cliffs, where there are ample sunny rocks for them to bake on during the day. The snakes are also capable of digging themselves into the soil.

The eastern brown snake is a species that is found in Queensland. The snake is named after its predominating color, however colour can range from uniform tan to grey or dark brown. The belly is cream, yellow or pale orange with darker orange spots. This species is a slender, small headed member of the cobra family. They are alert, fast moving, and highly venomous. Being very active during the day time, they feed on small lizards, mice, and ground dwelling birds.

== South Australia ==
To the south of the Northern Territory is South Australia. This state is mainly temperate with occasional desert areas. Sand dunes are common breeding grounds for snakes of this region. Most of the venomous tend to be in this area. This is because it receives large amounts of sun but at the same time allows for enough cover for protection. The tiger snake is a species that represent South Australia. They usually have striped markings hence their name; the markings can also change due to the seasons and the age of the snakes. They are very territorial, so they will live in the same place for years, and are found in a broad range of habitats including suburbs. Because of the fact they are territorial their habitats remain the same and they do not move around for any reason. For diet, these snakes feed on all types of creatures such as frogs, small fish, and other mammals.

== New South Wales ==
New South Wales is the central state on the east coast of Australia. This region surrounds the Australian Capital Territory) where the nation's capital Canberra is located. Most of the state is in a temperate climate zone which is not very conducive to snakes that need extended periods of heat in order to survive. NSW has large mountain ranges, and snow is present during the coldest winter months. Snakes are not found in the snowy regions, and are most common in the rural bushland which is interspersed with agricultural areas.

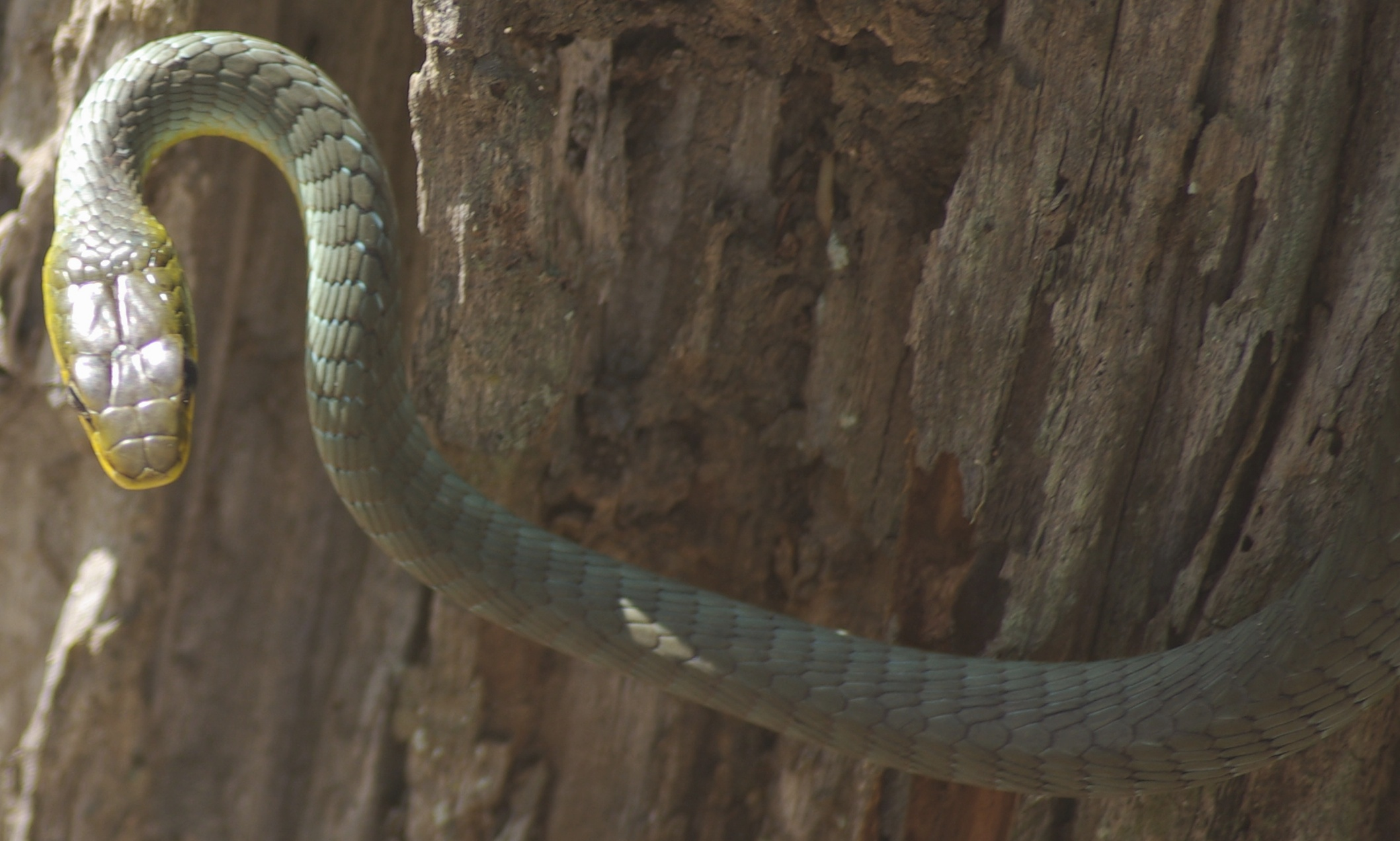
Common tree snake

The common tree snake is found in multiple provinces in Australia including New South Wales. Something unique about these snakes is that they stiffen in the shape of a beam to cross from branch to branch. Commonly hiding among the vines such as ivy, they are able to blend well with their habitat. They have a tiny head, and thin foreparts; however, they can reach up to 1.8 metres in length. They prey on birds, arboreal lizards, and frogs.

== Victoria ==
This state experiences a temperate climate and has a large coastal area. Fewer snakes are present than in warmer states, for snakes prefer a warmer and sunnier environment where they can bask. Being poikilothermic, they depend heavily upon external heat for survival.

The white-lipped snake is one of few species that is able to survive in the cold highland regions on Victoria. Its preferred habitat is tussock grass or sedge fields where the small snake finds shelter under logs or dense vegetation. Since the habitat is so frigid, its oviparous characteristic is very remarkable; the snake's small size and secretive habits most likely play a role in its survival under such conditions. Although these harsh conditions do not have much of an impact on the snake's eggs, it does affect its fecundity by limiting reproduction to every 2 to 3 years.

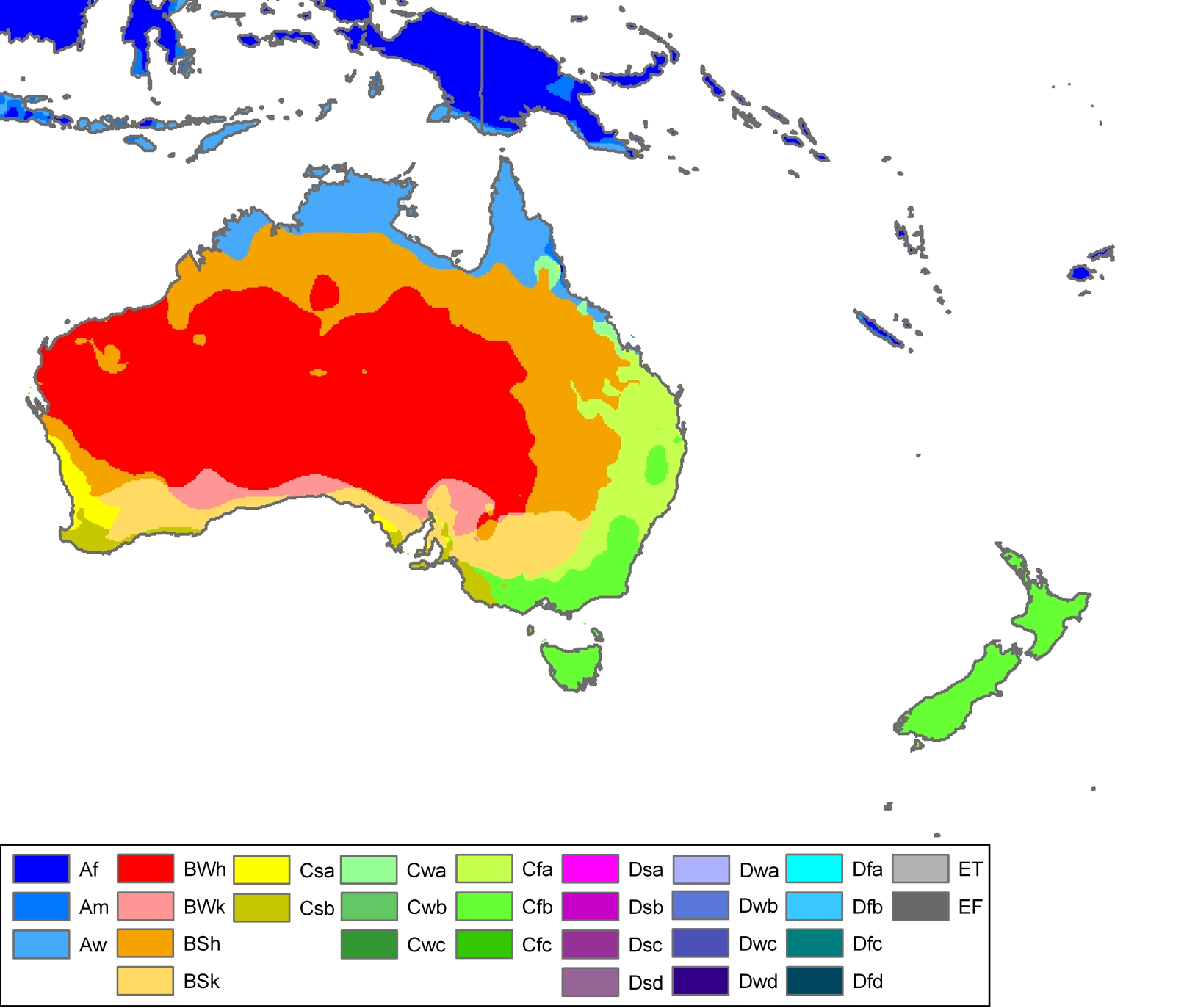
Australia-Oceania Köppen Map
