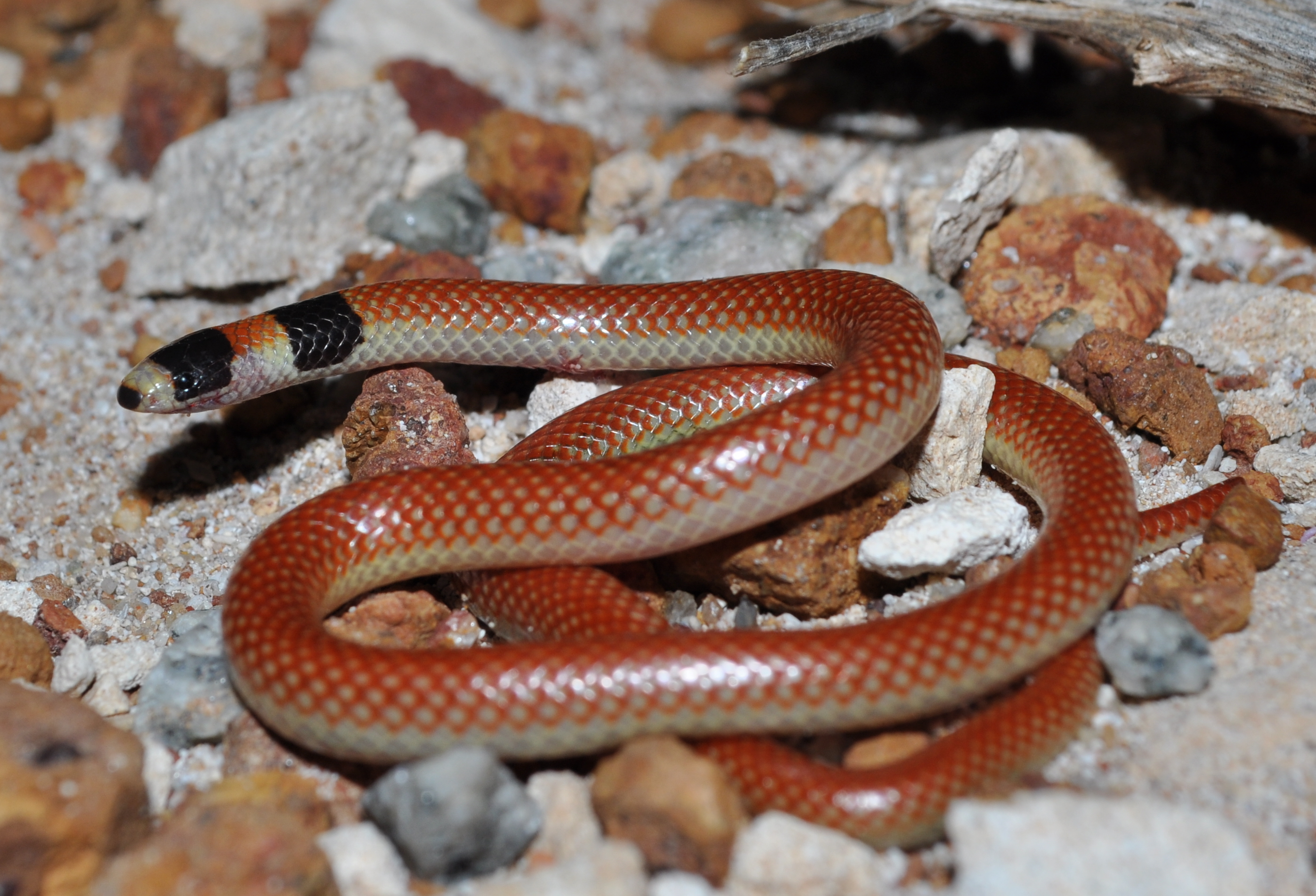
- Neelaps bimaculatus (black-naped snake)

Scientific classification
- Kingdom: Animalia
- Phylum: Chordata
- Order: Squamata
- Suborder: Serpentes
- Family: Elapidae
- Subfamily: Hydrophiinae
- Genus: Neelaps (A.M.C. Duméril, Bibron & A.H.A. Duméril, 1854)

= Neelaps =

Genus of Australian snakes

Neelaps is a genus in the family Elapidae of two snakes that are endemic to Australia.

== Species ==
- Neelaps bimaculatus - black-naped burrowing snake
- Neelaps calonotos - black-striped burrowing snake
