= Warrego burrowing snake =

Conservation status
- Data Deficient (IUCN 3.1)

Scientific classification
- Kingdom: Animalia
- Phylum: Chordata
- Class: Reptilia
- Order: Squamata
- Suborder: Serpentes
- Family: Elapidae
- Genus: Antaioserpens
- Species: A. warro

Binomial name
- Antaioserpens warro (De Vis, 1884)

Species of snake

The Warrego burrowing snake (Antaioserpens warro) is a species of snake native to western Queensland.
