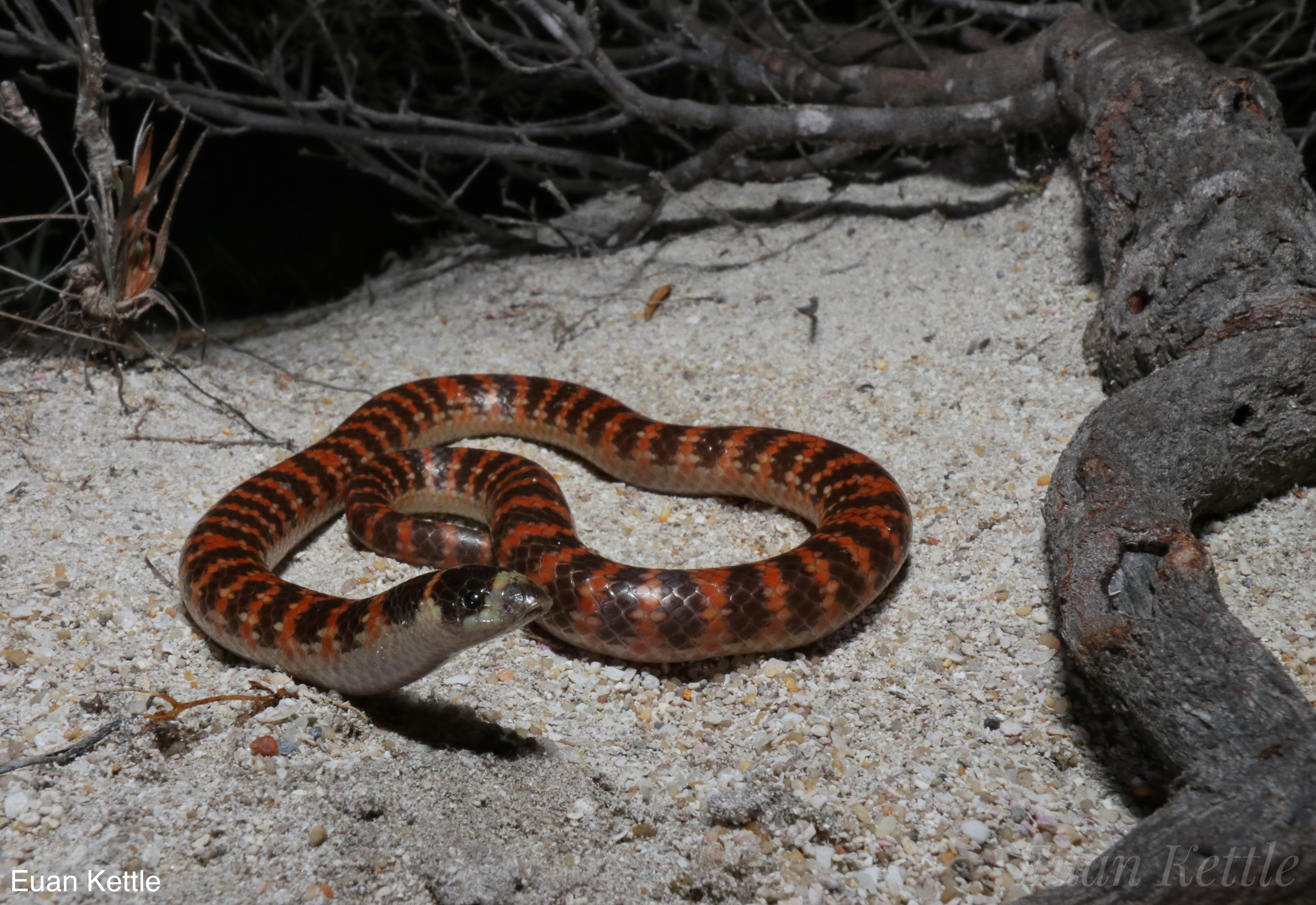

Conservation status
- Least Concern (IUCN 3.1)

Scientific classification
- Kingdom: Animalia
- Phylum: Chordata
- Class: Reptilia
- Order: Squamata
- Suborder: Serpentes
- Family: Elapidae
- Genus: Brachyurophis
- Species: B. semifasciatus

Binomial name
- Brachyurophis semifasciatus Günther, 1863

= Southern shovel-nosed snake =

Species of snake

The southern shovel-nosed snake (Brachyurophis semifasciatus) is a species of snake native to southern Australia. It eats reptile eggs.
