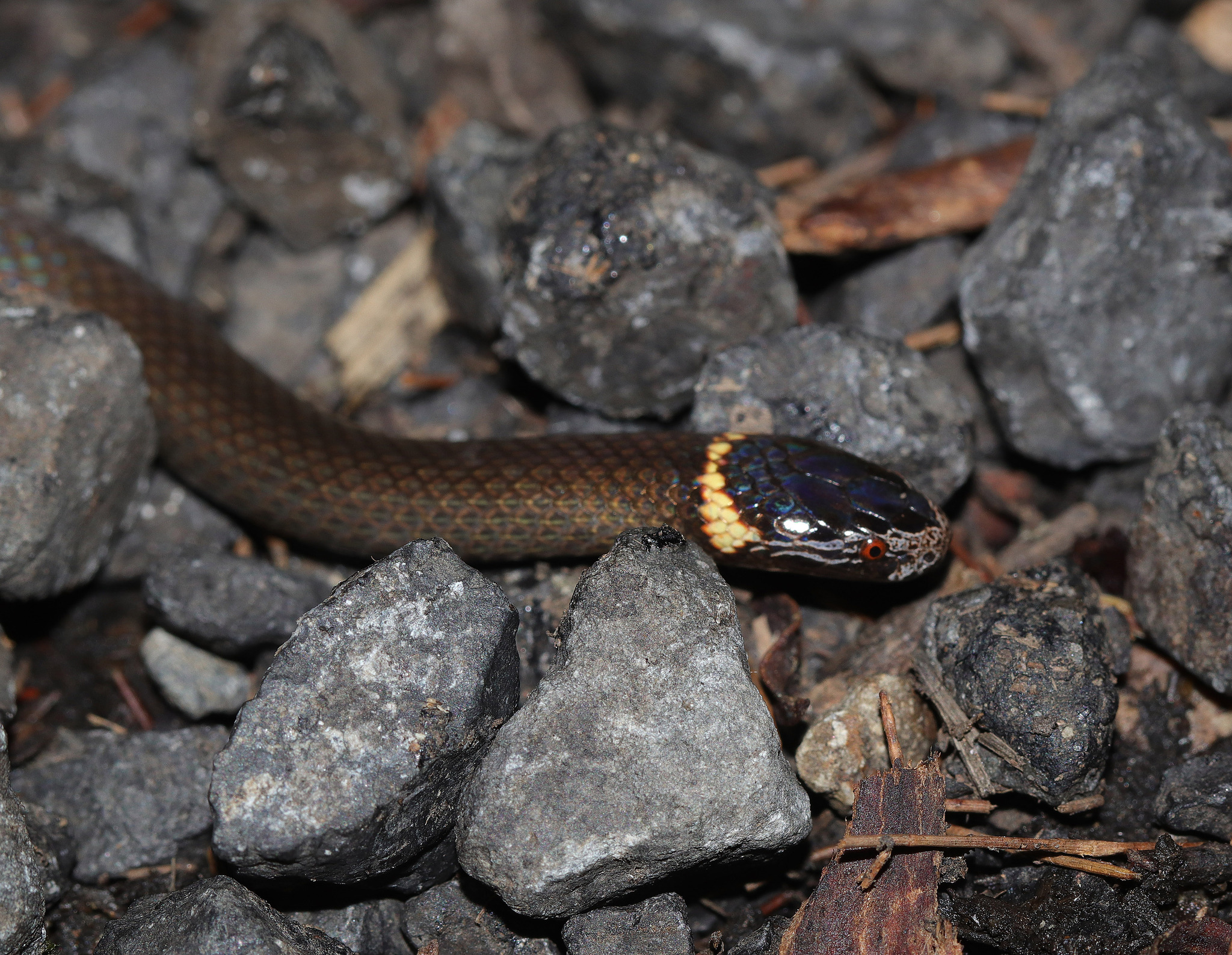

Conservation status
- Least Concern (IUCN 3.1)

Scientific classification
- Kingdom: Animalia
- Phylum: Chordata
- Class: Reptilia
- Order: Squamata
- Suborder: Serpentes
- Family: Elapidae
- Genus: Cacophis
- Species: C. krefftii

Binomial name
- Cacophis krefftii Günther, 1863

Synonyms
- Cacophis krefftii Günther, 1863; Pseudelaps krefftii — Boulenger, 1896; Cacophis krefftii — Cogger, 1983

= Cacophis krefftii =

Species of snake

Cacophis krefftii is a species of venomous snake in the family Elapidae. The species is endemic to Australia.

== Etymology ==
The specific name, krefftii, is in honor of German-born Australian naturalist Gerard Krefft.

== Common names ==
Common names for C. krefftii include dwarf crowned snake, southern dwarf crowned snake, and Krefft's dwarf snake.

== Description ==
C. krefftii may attain a total length (including tail) of 34.5 cm (13.6 in). Dorsally, it is dark gray, with a yellow nuchal collar. Ventrally it is yellow, with some black at the edges of the ventral scales.

== Geographic range ==
The geographic range of C. krefftii extends from the Central Coast of New South Wales to South East Queensland.

== Habitat ==
The preferred natural habitat of C. krefftii is forest.

== Behavior ==
C. krefftii is terrestrial and nocturnal. When threatened it may raise the anterior part of its body, in the manner of a cobra.

== Diet ==
C. krefftii preys upon sleeping diurnal skinks.

== Reproduction ==
C. krefftii is oviparous.
