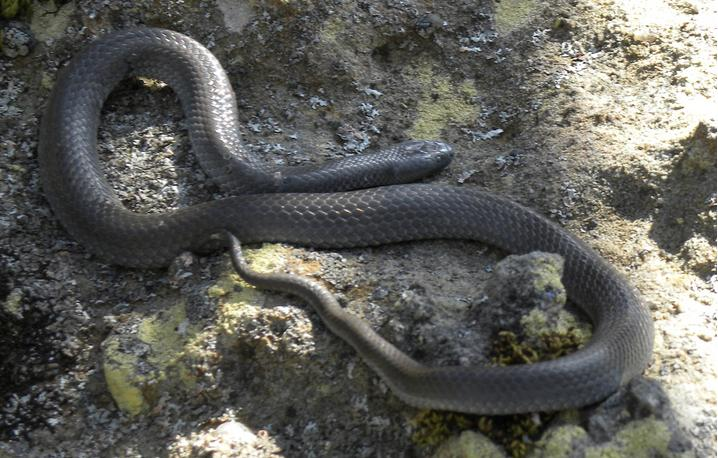

Conservation status
- Least Concern (IUCN 3.1)

Scientific classification
- Kingdom: Animalia
- Phylum: Chordata
- Class: Reptilia
- Order: Squamata
- Suborder: Serpentes
- Family: Elapidae
- Genus: Cryptophis
- Species: C. nigrescens

Binomial name
- Cryptophis nigrescens (Günther, 1862)

Synonyms
- Hoplocephalus nigrescens Günther, 1862; Alecto permixta Jan, 1863; Hoplocephalus assimilis Macleay, 1885; Denisonia nigrescens — Boulenger, 1896; Cryptophis nigrescens — Worrell, 1961; Rhinoplocephalus nigrescens — Hutchinson, 1990; Cryptophis nigrescens — Cogger, 2014

= Cryptophis nigrescens =

Species of snake

Cryptophis nigrescens, commonly known as the eastern small-eyed snake, is a species of venomous snake in the family Elapidae. The species is endemic to eastern Australia.

== Taxonomy ==
Cryptophis nigrescens was described by Albert Günther in 1862, assigning the new species to Hoplocephalus.

== Geographic range ==
Cryptophis nigrescens is found in the Australian states of New South Wales, Queensland, and Victoria.

== Common names ==
Common names for the species include short-tailed snake, small-eyed snake, and eastern small-eyed snake.

== Reproduction ==
Cryptophis nigrescens is viviparous.
