= Yellow-naped snake =

Conservation status
- Least Concern (IUCN 3.1)

Scientific classification
- Kingdom: Animalia
- Phylum: Chordata
- Class: Reptilia
- Order: Squamata
- Suborder: Serpentes
- Family: Elapidae
- Genus: Furina (snake)
- Species: F. barnardi

Binomial name
- Furina barnardi (Kinghorn, 1939)

Synonyms
- Glyphodon barnardi Kinghorn, 1939; Furina barnardi — Storr, 1981

Species of snake

The yellow-naped snake (Furina barnardi), also known commonly as Barnard's snake, is a small species of venomous snake in the family Elapidae. The species is native to northeastern Australia.

== Etymology ==
The specific name, barnardi, is in honor of Australian zoologist Henry "Harry" Greensill Barnard (1869–1966).

== Geographic range ==
F. barnardi is found in northeastern Queensland, Australia.

== Habitat ==
The preferred natural habitats of F. barnardi are forest and rocky areas.

== Description ==
The holotype of F. barnardi has a total length of 48 cm (19 in), which includes a tail 6 cm (2.4 in). In alcohol, the head and neck are blackish, with a yellowish patch on the nape of the neck. The body is uniformly reddish brown dorsally, and uniformly yellowish ventrally.

== Behavior ==
A nocturnal species, F. barnardi shelters during the day under leaf litter and fallen logs, and in burrows and soil cracks.

== Diet ==
F. barnardi preys upon skinks, especially those of the genus Sphenomorphus.

== Reproduction ==
F. barnardi is oviparous. Clutch size is 7–10 eggs.
