= Stegonotus cucullatus =

Conservation status
- Least Concern (IUCN 3.1)

Scientific classification
- Kingdom: Animalia
- Phylum: Chordata
- Class: Reptilia
- Order: Squamata
- Suborder: Serpentes
- Family: Colubridae
- Genus: Stegonotus
- Species: S. cucullatus

Binomial name
- Stegonotus cucullatus (A.M.C. Duméril, Bibron & A.H.A. Duméril, 1854)

Synonyms
- Lycodon cucullatum Duméril, Duméril & Bibron, 1854; Zamenophis australis Günther, 1872; Lydodon keyensis Doria, 1874; Lycodon magnus Meyer, 1874; Lycodon darnleyensis Macleay, 1877; Herbertophis plumbeus Macleay, 1884; Stegonotus plumbeus (Macleay, 1884); Stegonotus reticulatus Boulenger, 1895

Species of snake

Stegonotus cucullatus, or the slaty-grey snake, is a species of snake in the family Colubridae. The snake is found in Northern Territory and Queensland, Australia, and in New Guinea.
