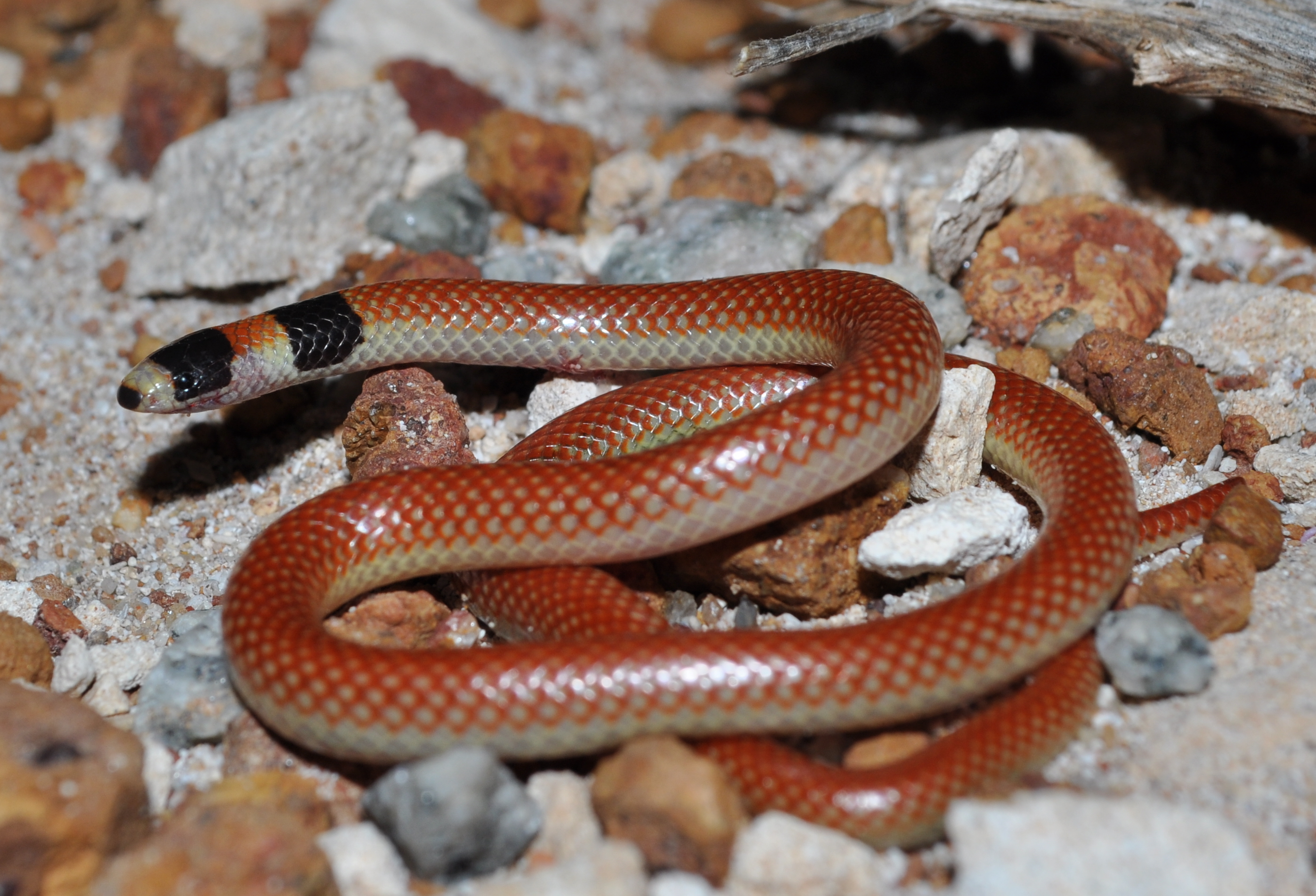

Scientific classification
- Domain: Eukaryota
- Kingdom: Animalia
- Phylum: Chordata
- Class: Reptilia
- Order: Squamata
- Suborder: Serpentes
- Family: Elapidae
- Genus: Neelaps
- Species: N. bimaculatus

Binomial name
- Neelaps bimaculatus (Duméril, Bibron & Duméril, 1854)

Synonyms
- Furina bimaculata Duméril, Bibron & Duméril, 1854; Vermicella bimaculata Glauert, 1950; Narophis bimaculatus Worrell, 1961; Simoselaps bimaculatus Cogger, 1992

= Neelaps bimaculatus =

Species of Australian snake

Neelaps bimaculatus, also known as the black-naped snake, western black-naped snake or black-naped burrowing snake, is a species of burrowing mildly venomous snake endemic to Australia. The specific epithet bimaculatus (“two-spotted”) refers to the distinctive black patches on head and nape.

== Description ==
The species grows to an average of about 40 cm in length.

== Behaviour ==
The species is oviparous, with an average clutch size of four.

== Distribution and habitat ==
The species occurs in South Australia and Western Australia.
