= Gould's hooded snake =

- Gould's Hooded Snake, in the Perth region

Conservation status
- Least Concern (IUCN 3.1)

Scientific classification
- Kingdom: Animalia
- Phylum: Chordata
- Class: Reptilia
- Order: Squamata
- Suborder: Serpentes
- Family: Elapidae
- Genus: Suta
- Species: S. gouldii

Binomial name
- Suta gouldii (Gray, 1841)

Synonyms
- Elaps gouldii Gray, 1841; Denisonia gouldii — Boulenger, 1896; Parasuta gouldii — Worrell, 1961; Suta gouldii — McDowell, 1970; Unechis gouldii — Cogger, 1975; Rhinoplocephalus gouldii — Storr, 1984; Parasuta gouldii — Greer, 2006; Suta gouldii — Maryan et al., 2020

Species of snake

Gould's hooded snake (Suta gouldii), also known commonly as the black-headed snake and Gould's black-headed snake, is a species of venomous snake in the family Elapidae. The species is endemic to Western Australia.

== Etymology ==
The specific name, gouldii, is in honor of English ornithologist John Gould.

== Description ==
Adults of S. gouldii have an average snout-to-vent length (SVL) of 30 cm (12 in), and the length of the tail is on average 13.3% SVL. The maximum recorded SVL is 47 cm (19 in).

== Habitat ==
The preferred natural habitats of S. gouldii are forest, shrubland, grassland, and rocky areas.

== Reproduction ==
S. gouldii is ovoviviparous.

== Venom ==
Although S. gouldii is venomous, its bite is considered to be of lesser medical significance. A life-threatening envenomation is unlikely, but a debilitating injury is possible.
