= Drysdalia mastersii =

Conservation status
- Least Concern (IUCN 3.1)

Scientific classification
- Kingdom: Animalia
- Phylum: Chordata
- Class: Reptilia
- Order: Squamata
- Suborder: Serpentes
- Family: Elapidae
- Genus: Drysdalia
- Species: D. mastersii

Binomial name
- Drysdalia mastersii (Krefft, 1866)

Synonyms
- Hoplocephalus mastersii Krefft, 1866; Notechis mastersii (Kreft, 1866); Denisonia coronoides Boulenger, 1896 (partim)

Species of Australian snake

Drysdalia mastersii, also known commonly as Masters's snake or Masters' snake, is a species of venomous snake in the family Elapidae. The species is endemic to Australia.

== Etymology ==
The specific epithet mastersii is in honour of Australian entomologist George Masters who collected specimens for Gerard Krefft.

== Description ==
Drysdalia mastersii grows to an average total length (tail included) of about 40 cm (16 in). The upper body is light brown to dark grey, with a pale band over the nape and a white stripe extending from the upper lip to the neck.

== Geographic distribution ==
The geographic distribution of Drysdalia mastersii extends eastwards from near Esperance in Western Australia into coastal and subcoastal South Australia, as well as into south-eastern South Australia and western Victoria. The type locality is the Flinders Ranges of South Australia.

== Habitat ==
The preferred natural habitats of Drysdalia mastersii are heathland, grassland, and mallee on sandy and limestone soils.

== Diet ==
Drysdalia mastersii preys predominately upon lizards.

== Reproduction ==
Drysdalia mastersii is viviparous, with an average litter size of three.
