= Collared whipsnake =

Demansia torquata

Conservation status
- Least Concern (IUCN 3.1)

Scientific classification
- Kingdom: Animalia
- Phylum: Chordata
- Class: Reptilia
- Order: Squamata
- Suborder: Serpentes
- Family: Elapidae
- Genus: Demansia
- Species: D. torquata

Binomial name
- Demansia torquata Günther, 1862

Species of snake

The collared whipsnake (Demansia torquata) is a medium-sized elapid endemic to Australia. It is found in rainforest edges and other tropical woodland areas as well as in rocky habitat and environments on offshore islands.

== Taxonomy ==
The species was described from a single specimen, presumably collected in 1859 in Percy Islands. The holotype specimen had a snout-vent length (SVL) of 443, with 199 ventral scales and 83 subcaudal scales.

=== Etymology ===
The etymology of the species' name presumably derives from the latin word torquatus meaning "collared".

== Description ==
This species has a characteristic dark nuchal collar (band across the nape) with a pale edge. The collar is more obscure in adult individuals than juveniles. They also have a prominent streak across the rostrum that extends to the eye, again with pale cream streaks that are more obscure in adults. This rostral streak adjoins with another pale streak behind the eye, forming a 'teardrop' marking that is characteristic of many snakes in this genus. The head and dorsum is dark brown in juveniles, and contrasts with the paler ventrum. In adults however, these are closer to olive-green and the dorsum is a somewhat similar colour to the ventrum.

Generally, the adult SVL is 171–636 mm, number of ventral scales is 185–214, number of subcaudal scales is 76–106 and tail length is between 26.1% and 38.7% of SVL.

=== Sexual Dimorphism ===
Male specimens generally have a greater number of ventral and subcaudal scales, as well as longer tails. There is no significant size difference between males and females of this species.

=== Similar Species ===
Demansia torquata is the only species of its genus with a collared nape within its geographical distribution. D. rimicola is the closest species, geographically. It can be distinguished from D. torquata as the latter has a pale upper edge of the 'teardrop' marking extending across the face and adjoining with the anterior band of the nape collar. Furthermore, D. torquata has a greyish hue of the ventral aspect, which differs from most other Demasia species. Scale counts, particularly of the ventral and subcaudal scales, can also be a diagnostic tool for identification.

== Distribution ==
Collared whipsnakes are found along the coast and range of eastern Queensland, extending from Batavia Downs in the north to Mount Larcom in the south. They are also found on islands off the coast of Queensland, including islands within the Whitsundays group, Cumberland group and Northumberland Islands. There are records of their presence in western Queensland, as well as northern NSW and the Northern Territory. However, these are based on other similar species, and reliability is contested.

== Behaviour ==
Collared whipsnakes are diurnal species. They predate mainly on other reptiles, particularly small skinks and other lizards.

The species seem to ovulate synchronously during the spring. They are oviparous species, and tend to lay clutches of 2-8 eggs (average of 4 eggs).
