= Drysdalia rhodogaster =

Conservation status
- Least Concern (IUCN 3.1)

Scientific classification
- Kingdom: Animalia
- Phylum: Chordata
- Class: Reptilia
- Order: Squamata
- Suborder: Serpentes
- Family: Elapidae
- Genus: Drysdalia
- Species: D. rhodogaster

Binomial name
- Drysdalia rhodogaster (Jan & Sordelli, 1873)

Synonyms
- Alecto rhodogaster Jan & Sordelli, 1873; Hoplocephalus collaris Macleay, 1887; Denisonia coronoides Boulenger, 1896; Pseudelaps minutus Fry, 1915; Aspidomorphus minutus Minton et al., 1970; Notechis rhodogaster Storr, 1982

Species of Australian snake

Drysdalia rhodogaster, also known as the mustard-bellied snake or Blue Mountains crowned snake, is a species of venomous snake endemic to Australia. The specific epithet rhodogaster ("red-bellied") refers to body colouration.

== Description ==
The snake grows to an average of about 40 cm in length. The upper body is brown to grey, with a darker head and a yellow to orange band over the nape.

== Behaviour ==
The species is viviparous, with an average litter size of five. Its diet consists mainly of lizards.

== Distribution and habitat ==
The species' distribution is limited to south-eastern New South Wales.
