= Simoselaps littoralis =

Conservation status
- Least Concern (IUCN 3.1)

Scientific classification
- Kingdom: Animalia
- Phylum: Chordata
- Class: Reptilia
- Order: Squamata
- Suborder: Serpentes
- Family: Elapidae
- Genus: Simoselaps
- Species: S. littoralis

Binomial name
- Simoselaps littoralis (Storr, 1968) Mengden, 1983

Synonyms
- Vermicella bertholdi littoralis Storr, 1968

Species of Australian snake

Simoselaps littoralis, also known as the west coast banded snake or coastal burrowing snake, is a species of mildly venomous burrowing snake that is endemic to Australia. The specific epithet littoralis ("coastal") refers to the species' distribution and habitat.

== Description ==
The species grows to an average of about 39 cm in length.

== Behaviour ==
The species is oviparous, with an average clutch size of four.

== Distribution and habitat ==
The species occurs in coastal dune and heath habitats along the west coast of Western Australia south of Exmouth, including coastal islands.
