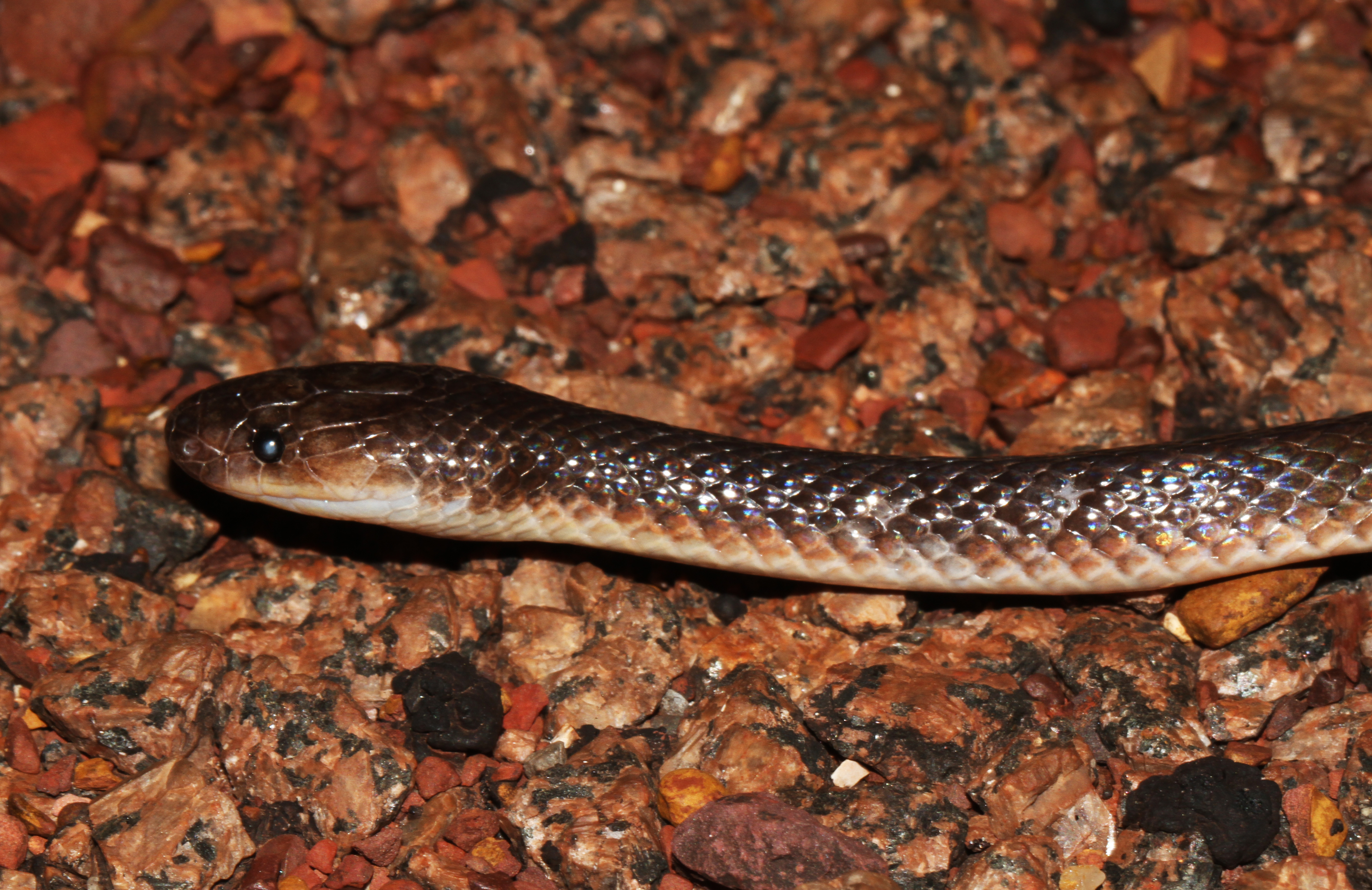

Conservation status
- Least Concern (IUCN 3.1)

Scientific classification
- Kingdom: Animalia
- Phylum: Chordata
- Class: Reptilia
- Order: Squamata
- Suborder: Serpentes
- Family: Elapidae
- Genus: Cryptophis
- Species: C. pallidiceps

Binomial name
- Cryptophis pallidiceps (Günther, 1858)

Synonyms
- Hoplocephalus pallidiceps Günther, 1858; Denisonia pallidiceps Boulenger, 1896; Rhinoplocephalus pallidiceps Hutchinson, 1990

= Cryptophis pallidiceps =

Species of Australian snake

Cryptophis pallidiceps, also known as the western Carpentaria snake or northern small-eyed snake, is a species of venomous snake endemic to Australia. The specific epithet pallidiceps ("pale-headed") refers to its body markings.

== Description ==
The snake grows to an average of about 50 cm in length. The upper body is brown, grey or black, often with a paler head. The sides of the body are yellow-orangish, the belly white.

== Behaviour ==
The species is viviparous, with an average litter size of four. It feeds on lizards and frogs.

== Distribution and habitat ==
The species occurs in the Kimberley region of Western Australia and the Top End of the Northern Territory. It inhabits tropical woodlands. The type locality is Port Essington in the Northern Territory.
