= Simoselaps anomalus =

Conservation status
- Least Concern (IUCN 3.1)

Scientific classification
- Kingdom: Animalia
- Phylum: Chordata
- Class: Reptilia
- Order: Squamata
- Suborder: Serpentes
- Family: Elapidae
- Genus: Simoselaps
- Species: S. anomalus

Binomial name
- Simoselaps anomalus (Sternfeld, 1919)

Synonyms
- Rhynchelaps anomalus Sternfeld, 1919; Rhynchoelaps bertholdi anomalus – Worrell, 1963; Vermicella anomala – Storr, 1978; Simoselaps anomalus – Mengden, 1983

Species of Australian snake

Simoselaps anomalus, also known as the northern desert banded snake, is a species of mildly venomous burrowing snake that is endemic to Australia.

== Description ==
The species grows to an average of about 25 cm in length.

== Behaviour ==
The species is oviparous, with an average clutch size of three.

== Distribution and habitat ==
The species' range covers a broad swathe of arid inland Australia from north-western South Australia and the south-west of the Northern Territory, across Western Australia to the north-western coast of the continent. The type locality is the Hermannsburg Mission, on the upper Finke River, Northern Territory.
