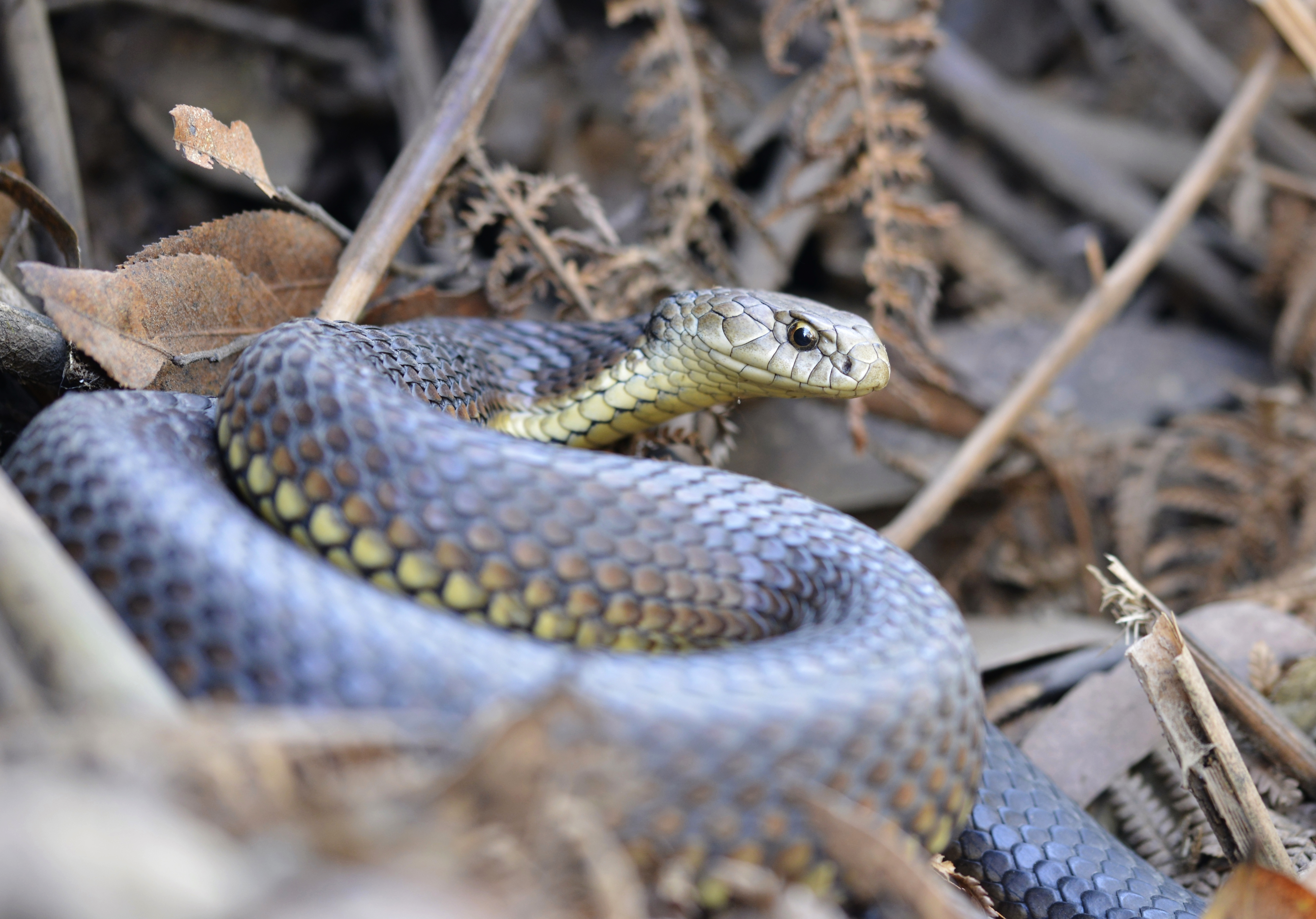

Conservation status
- Least Concern (IUCN 3.1)

Scientific classification
- Kingdom: Animalia
- Phylum: Chordata
- Class: Reptilia
- Order: Squamata
- Suborder: Serpentes
- Family: Elapidae
- Genus: Austrelaps
- Species: A. ramsayi

Binomial name
- Austrelaps ramsayi (Krefft, 1864)

Synonyms
- Hoplocephalus ramsayi Krefft, 1864; Denisonia ramsayi — Boulenger, 1896; Austrelaps ramsayi — Rawlinson, 1991

= Highland copperhead =

Austrelaps ramsayi

Highly venomous snake native to southeastern Australia

The highland copperhead (Austrelaps ramsayi), also known as Ramsay's copperhead, is a species of venomous snake in the family Elapidae endemic to Australia.

== Taxonomy ==
Gerard Krefft described the highland copperhead in 1864 as Hoplocephalus ramsayi from a specimen collected in Braidwood, New South Wales. The specific name, ramsayi, is in honour of Edward Pierson Ramsay, who was an Australian ornithologist, herpetologist, and who collected the holotype specimen.

== Description ==
Austrelaps ramsayi has an average total length (including tail) of 130 cm (51 inches). Variable in colour, ranging from pale to dark grey, through reddish-brown or chocolate brown to almost black above but always low gloss or matt sheen; noticeably enlarged lateral scales may be cream, yellow or reddish-brown (typically yellow paraventral scales bordered above by reddish-brown); while the supralabial (upper lip) scales are strongly barred, the pale, triangular lower front corner of each labial strongly contrasting with the remainder of the scale, which is dark brown. Belly cream to pale yellow or sometimes leaden-coloured.

== Distribution and habitat ==
The highlands copperhead inhabits the Alpine regions of eastern Australia, and is common in the Southern Highlands of NSW, including Mittagong, Bowral and Moss Vale.

A. ramsayi is found in montane heath, woodland, sclerophyll forests, along water bodies, and in swampy areas with thick clumps of tussock grass.

== Reproduction ==
Austrelaps ramsayi is ovoviviparous meaning the females give birth to live young, with the embryos developing inside eggs retained within the mother's body. Brood sizes range from 9 to 31 offspring per litter. This reproductive strategy provides added protection for the developing young until they are ready to be born.
