= Monk snake =

Conservation status
- Least Concern (IUCN 3.1)

Scientific classification
- Kingdom: Animalia
- Phylum: Chordata
- Class: Reptilia
- Order: Squamata
- Suborder: Serpentes
- Family: Elapidae
- Genus: Suta
- Species: S. monachus

Binomial name
- Suta monachus (Storr, 1964)

Synonyms
- Denisonia monachus Storr, 1964; Suta monachus — McDowell, 1970; Unechis monachus — Cogger, 1975; Rhinoplocephalus monachus — Storr, 1984; Parasuta monachus — Greer, 2006

Species of snake

The monk snake (Suta monachus), also known commonly as the hooded snake, is a species of venomous snake in the family Elapidae. The species is native to central and western Australia.

== Geographic range ==
Within Australia, S. monachus is found in the states and territories of Northern Territory, South Australia, and Western Australia.

== Habitat ==
The preferred natural habitats of S. monachus are savanna and shrubland.

== Description ==
The average snout-to-vent length (SVL) of adults of S. monachus is 27 cm (11 in), and the length of the tail is about 13% SVL. The maximum recorded SVL is 46 centimetres (18 in). The top of the head is solid glossy black, without any pale markings. On average, this black "hood" extends on the nape to the fourth vertebral scale, but may extend only to the first or as far as the sixth. The body and tail are brick red dorsally, and white ventrally. The upper labials are white also. There is only one posterior temporal scale.

== Diet ==
S. monachus preys upon lizards.

== Reproduction ==
S. monachus is viviparous.

== Venom ==
Although S. monachus is venomous, its bite is considered to be of lesser medical significance. A life-threatening envenomation is unlikely, but a debilitating injury is possible.
