= Cacophis harriettae =

Conservation status
- Least Concern (IUCN 3.1)

Scientific classification
- Kingdom: Animalia
- Phylum: Chordata
- Class: Reptilia
- Order: Squamata
- Suborder: Serpentes
- Family: Elapidae
- Genus: Cacophis
- Species: C. harriettae

Binomial name
- Cacophis harriettae Krefft, 1869

Synonyms
- Cacophis harrietae Krefft, 1869; Pseudelaps harriettae — Boulenger, 1896; Glyphodon harrietae — Worrell, 1961; Cacophis harriettae — Cogger, 1983

Species of Australian snake

Cacophis harriettae, also known commonly as Harriett's snake, the white-crowned snake, and the white-naped snake, is a species of mildly venomous snake in the family Elapidae. The species is endemic to Australia.

== Etymology ==
The specific epithet, harriettae, honours natural history illustrator Harriet Scott, who illustrated Gerard Krefft's The Snakes of Australia, including this species.

== Description ==
C. hariettae grows to an average total length (including tail) of 40 cm (16 in), and a maximum total length of 56 cm (22 in). The upper surface of the body is dark grey to black, with broad white bands extending from the snout along the sides of the head to meet at the nape.

== Reproduction ==
C. hariettae is oviparous, with an average clutch size of five (range 2–10).

== Diet ==
C. hariettae preys upon on lizards, and also eats reptile eggs.

== Geographic range ==
The distribution of C. hariettae extends from Mount Abbott, near Proserpine in eastern Queensland, south-eastwards to north-eastern New South Wales.

== Habitat ==
C. harriettae occurs in moist habitats, including rainforests and wet sclerophyll forests as well as suburban gardens.
