= Suta punctata =

Scientific classification
- Kingdom: Animalia
- Phylum: Chordata
- Class: Reptilia
- Order: Squamata
- Suborder: Serpentes
- Family: Elapidae
- Genus: Suta
- Species: S. punctata

Binomial name
- Suta punctata (Boulenger, 1896) McDowell, 1970

Synonyms
- Denisonia punctata Boulenger, 1896; Rhinoplocephalus punctatus Storr, 1984

Species of Australian snake

Suta punctata, also known as the spotted snake or little spotted snake, is a species of venomous snake that is endemic to Australia. The specific epithet punctata ("spotted") refers to the body markings.

== Description ==
Colouration is reddish-brown on the upper body, with a pale belly and black markings on head and neck. It grows to an average of about 40 cm in length.

== Behaviour ==
The species is viviparous, with an average litter size of four.

== Distribution and habitat ==
The species occurs in the Pilbara and Kimberley regions of Western Australia, in the Northern Territory from the Top End to as far south as Alice Springs, and in north-western Queensland. The type locality is Port Walcott in the Pilbara.
