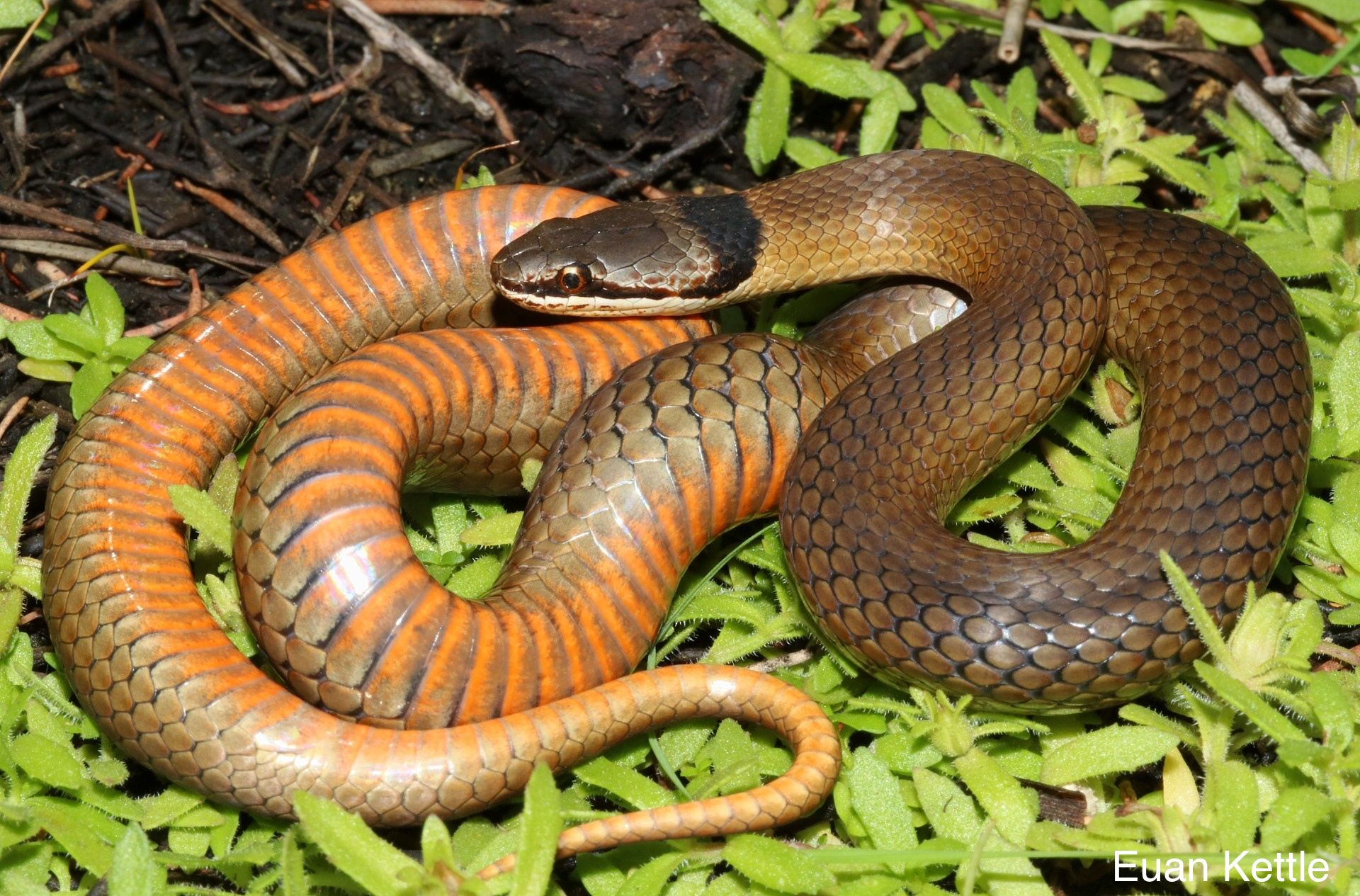

Conservation status
- Least Concern (IUCN 3.1)

Scientific classification
- Kingdom: Animalia
- Phylum: Chordata
- Class: Reptilia
- Order: Squamata
- Suborder: Serpentes
- Family: Elapidae
- Genus: Elapognathus
- Species: E. coronatus

Binomial name
- Elapognathus coronatus (Schlegel, 1837)

Synonyms
- Western Crowned Snake: Drysdalia coronata

= Crowned snake =

Species of snake

The crowned snake (Elapognathus coronatus) is a species of venomous snake in the family Elapidae. The species is endemic to southwestern Western Australia, including the Recherché Archipelago.

Its habitat is swamps, coastal woodlands and heaths, and is known to use stick ant nests as shelters. The species feeds mostly on skinks and frogs, and gives birth to three to nine live young.
