= Cryptophis boschmai =

Conservation status
- Least Concern (IUCN 3.1)

Scientific classification
- Kingdom: Animalia
- Phylum: Chordata
- Class: Reptilia
- Order: Squamata
- Suborder: Serpentes
- Family: Elapidae
- Genus: Cryptophis
- Species: C. boschmai

Binomial name
- Cryptophis boschmai (Brongersma & Knaap-van Meeuven, 1964)

Synonyms
- Denisonia boschmai Brongersma & Knaap-van Meeuven, 1964; Unechis carpentariae Worrell, 1961; Unechis boschmai — Mengden, 1983; Rhinoplocephalus boschmai – Wilson & Knowles, 1988; Suta boschmai – Shine, 1994; Cryptophis boschmai — Escoriza Boj, 2005; Cryptophis boschmai — Cogger, 2014

Species of snake

Cryptophis boschmai, also known commonly as the Carpentaria snake or the Carpentaria whip snake, is a species of venomous snake in the family Elapidae. The species is native to Australia and New Guinea.

== Etymology ==
The specific epithet boschmai honours Dutch zoologist Hilbrand Boschma.

== Description ==
The colouration of C. boschmai is tan to dark brown on the upper body, with a pale belly. It grows to a total length (including tail) of about 45 centimetres (18 in).

== Behaviour ==
C. boschmai is terrestrial and nocturnal, sheltering during the day under bark, logs, and leaf litter.

== Diet ==
C. boschmai preys upon small lizards.

== Reproduction ==
The species C. boschmai is viviparous, with an average litter size of eight.

== Geographic range and habitat ==
The distribution of C. boschmai in Australia extends from the northern part of the Cape York Peninsula, covering eastern Queensland as far south as the border with New South Wales, where it inhabits dry forests, woodlands, shrubland, and grasslands. The type locality is Merauke in southern New Guinea.
