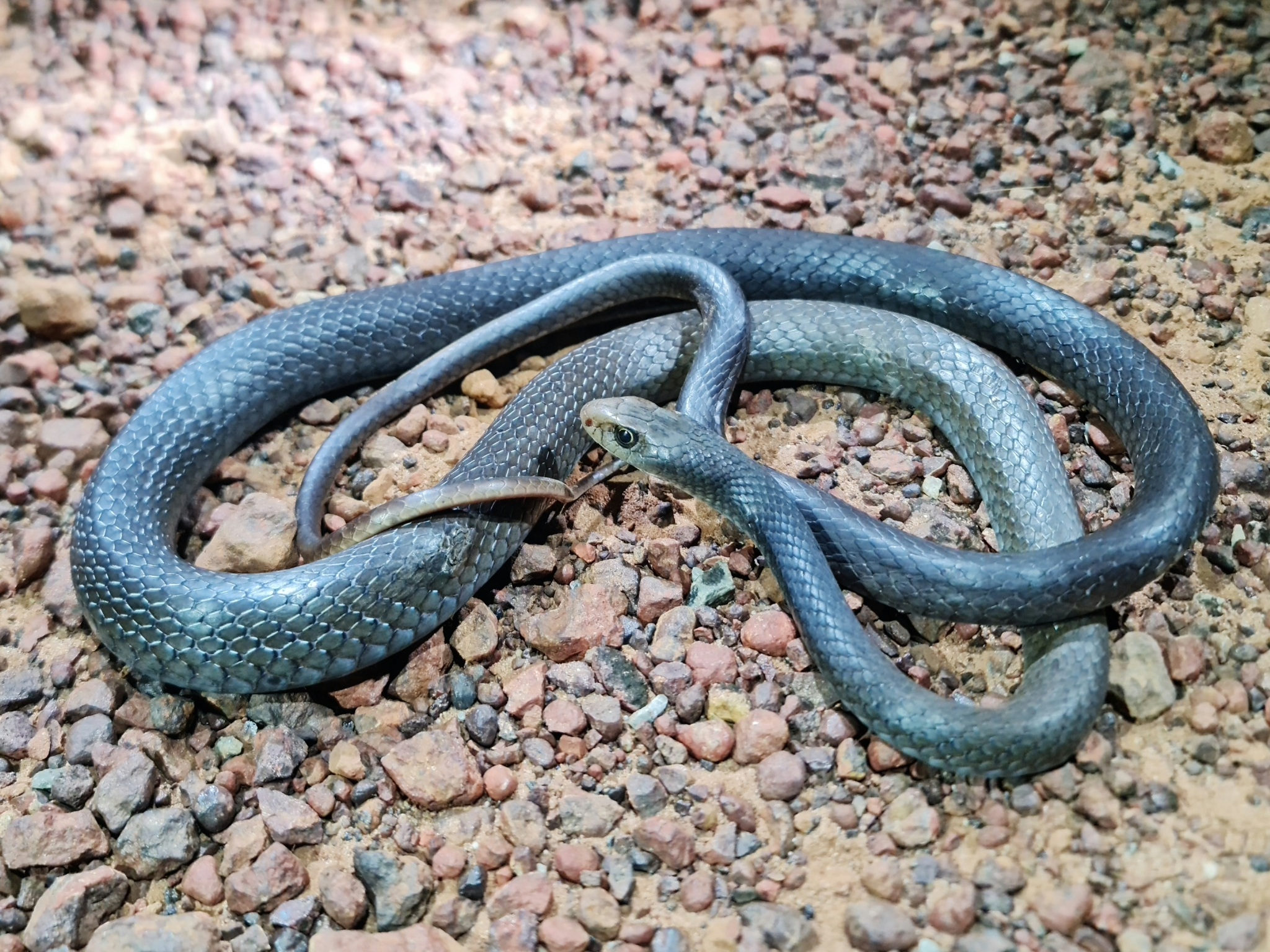

Conservation status
- Least Concern (IUCN 3.1)

Scientific classification
- Kingdom: Animalia
- Phylum: Chordata
- Class: Reptilia
- Order: Squamata
- Suborder: Serpentes
- Family: Elapidae
- Genus: Demansia
- Species: D. papuensis

Binomial name
- Demansia papuensis (Macleay, 1877)

= Greater black whipsnake =

Demansia papuensis

Species of snake

The greater black whipsnake (Demansia papuensis) is a species of venomous snake in the family Elapidae.

== Description ==
D. papuensis has a constant light to dark brown or black colouration, and a tan coloured head with small dark spots. The species is able to reach up to 1.5 m (4.9 ft).

== Distribution and habitat ==
The snake is found mainly in the northern parts of Australia (the far north-east of Western Australia, north Northern Territory, and Northern Queensland). It lives in open forests and woodlands.
