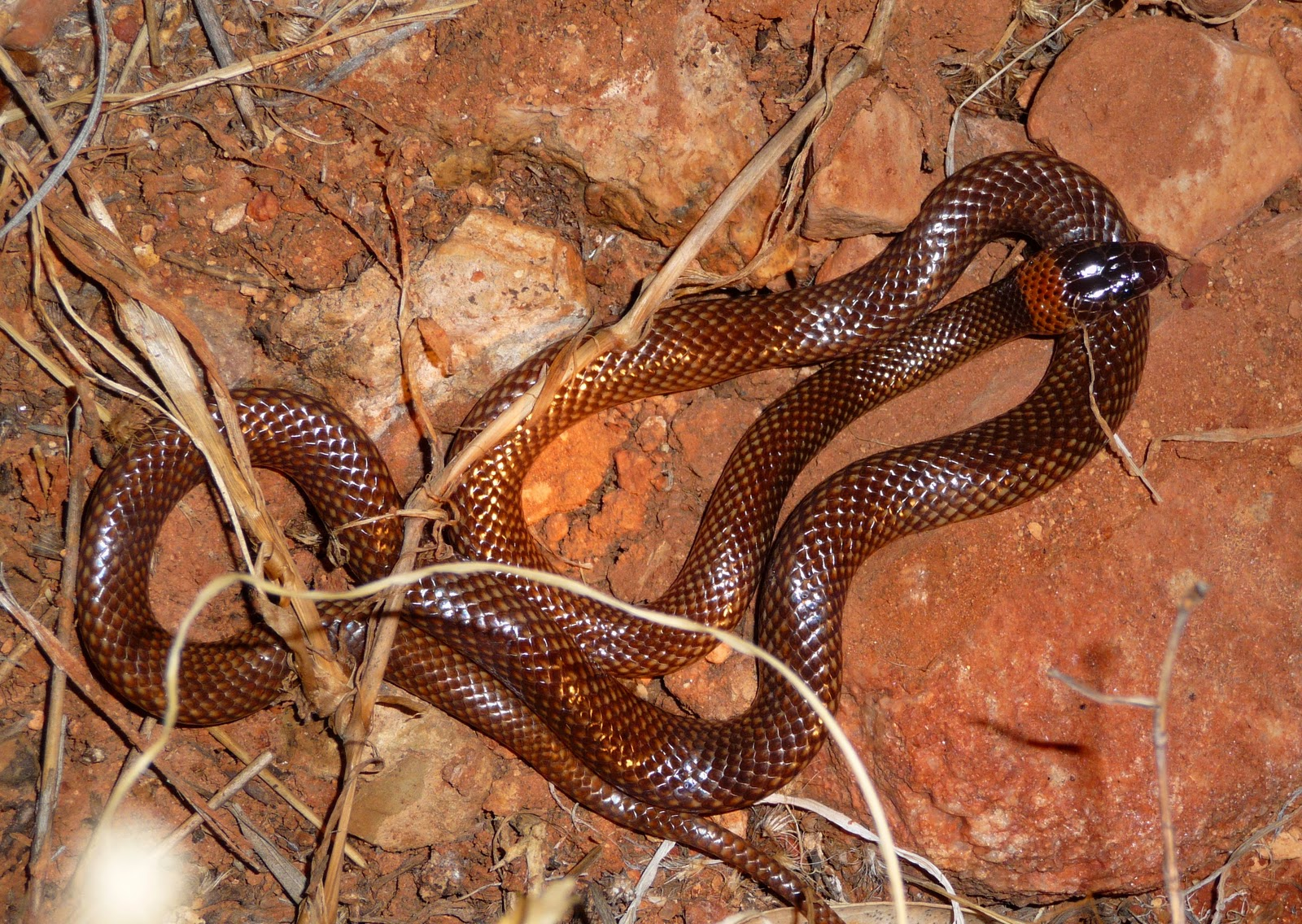

Conservation status
- Least Concern (IUCN 3.1)

Scientific classification
- Kingdom: Animalia
- Phylum: Chordata
- Class: Reptilia
- Order: Squamata
- Suborder: Serpentes
- Family: Elapidae
- Genus: Furina (snake)
- Species: F. ornata

Binomial name
- Furina ornata (JE Gray, 1842)

Synonyms
- Elaps ornatus Gray, 1942; Brachysoma simile Macleay, 1878; Denisonia bancrofti DeVis, 1911; Pseudelaps christieanus Fry, 1915

= Orange-naped snake =

Species of snake

The orange-naped snake (Furina ornata), also known as the moon snake, is a small venomous reptile native to northern and northwestern Australia.

== Distribution ==
The orange-naped snake is found in much of Western Australia north of Perth, as well as in parts of the Northern Territory and Queensland. It is the only member of the Furina genus found in Western Australia.
