= Suta fasciata =

Scientific classification
- Kingdom: Animalia
- Phylum: Chordata
- Class: Reptilia
- Order: Squamata
- Suborder: Serpentes
- Family: Elapidae
- Genus: Suta
- Species: S. fasciata

Binomial name
- Suta fasciata (Rosén, 1905) McDowell, 1970

Synonyms
- Denisonia fasciata Rosen 1905; Hulimkai fasciata Hoser, 2012

Species of Australian snake

Suta minimus, also known as Rosen's snake, is a species of venomous snake that is endemic to Australia. The specific epithet fasciata (“banded”) refers to the body markings.

== Description ==
The species grows to an average of about 40 cm in length.

== Behaviour ==
The snake is viviparous, with a litter size of four.

== Distribution and habitat ==
The species occurs in much of arid inland Western Australia.
