= Olive whipsnake =

Conservation status
- Least Concern (IUCN 3.1)

Scientific classification
- Kingdom: Animalia
- Phylum: Chordata
- Class: Reptilia
- Order: Squamata
- Suborder: Serpentes
- Family: Elapidae
- Genus: Demansia
- Species: D. olivacea

Binomial name
- Demansia olivacea (JE Gray, 1842)

Synonyms
- Lycodon olivaceus, Gray

Species of snake

The olive whipsnake (Demansia olivacea) is a species of venomous snake in the family Elapidae.

== Reproduction ==
This D. olivacea species does not have an obvious pattern of reproduction, meaning it does not follow a seasonal pattern. It reproduces offspring throughout the year.
