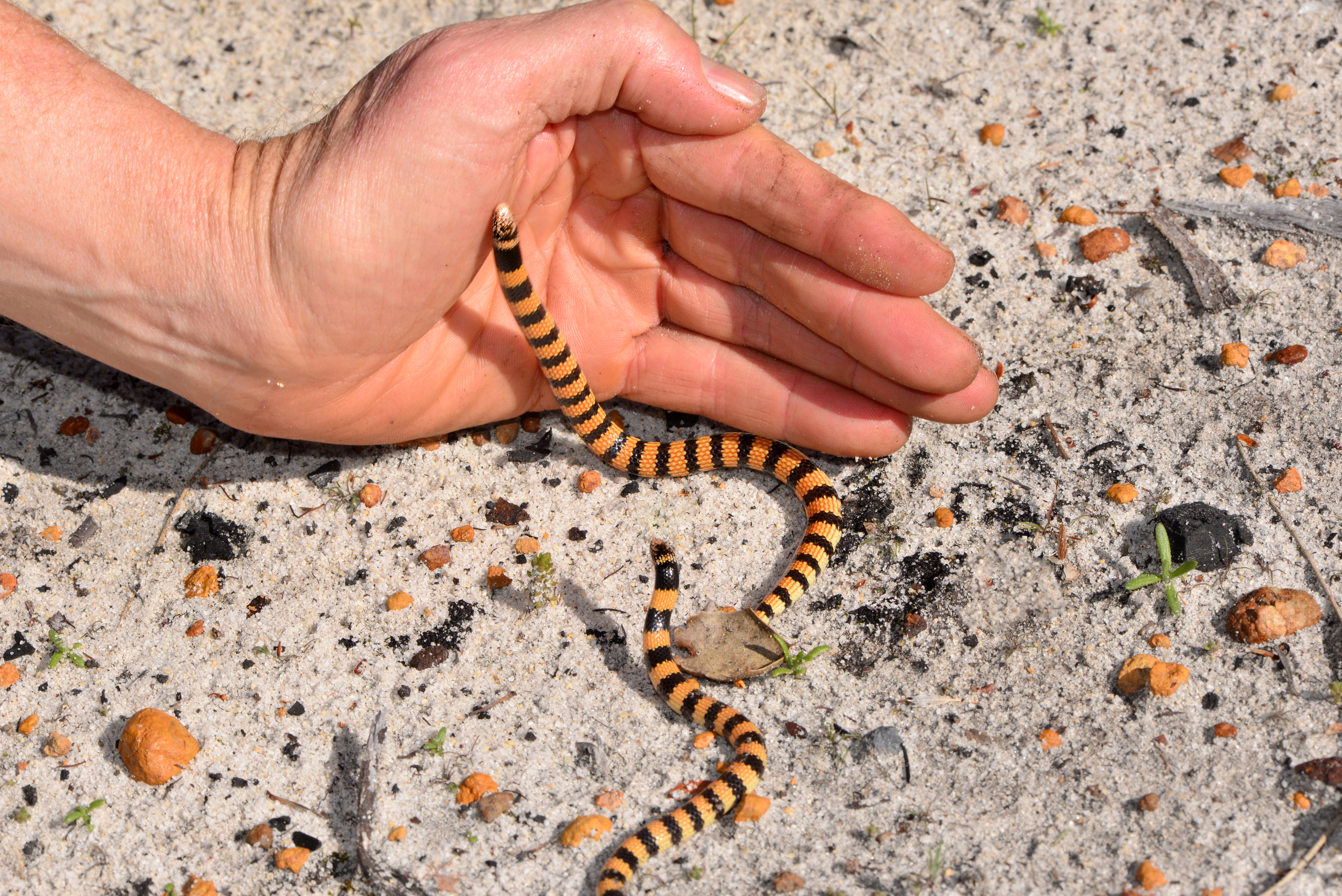

Scientific classification
- Kingdom: Animalia
- Phylum: Chordata
- Class: Reptilia
- Order: Squamata
- Suborder: Serpentes
- Family: Elapidae
- Genus: Simoselaps
- Species: S. bertholdi

Binomial name
- Simoselaps bertholdi (Jan, 1859)

Synonyms
- Elaps bertholdi Jan, 1859; Vermicella bertholdi — Ogilby, 1891; Elaps mattozoi Ferreira, 1891; Furina robusta De Vis, 1905; Rhynchelaps bertholdi — Thomson, 1934; Simoselaps bertholdi — Mengden, 1983

= Simoselaps bertholdi =

Species of Australian snake

Simoselaps bertholdi, also known commonly as Jan's banded snake or the southern desert banded snake, is a species of burrowing mildly venomous snake in the family Elapidae. The species is endemic to Australia.

== Etymology ==
The specific epithet bertholdi honours German physician and naturalist Arnold Adolph Berthold.

== Description ==
S. bertholdi grows to an average total length (including tail) of 30 cm (12 in).

== Reproduction ==
S. bertholdi is oviparous, with an average clutch size of four.

== Distribution and habitat ==
The geographic range of S. bertholdi covers a broad swathe of arid inland Australia from central and western South Australia and the south-west of the Northern Territory, westwards across Western Australia to the western coast of the continent.
