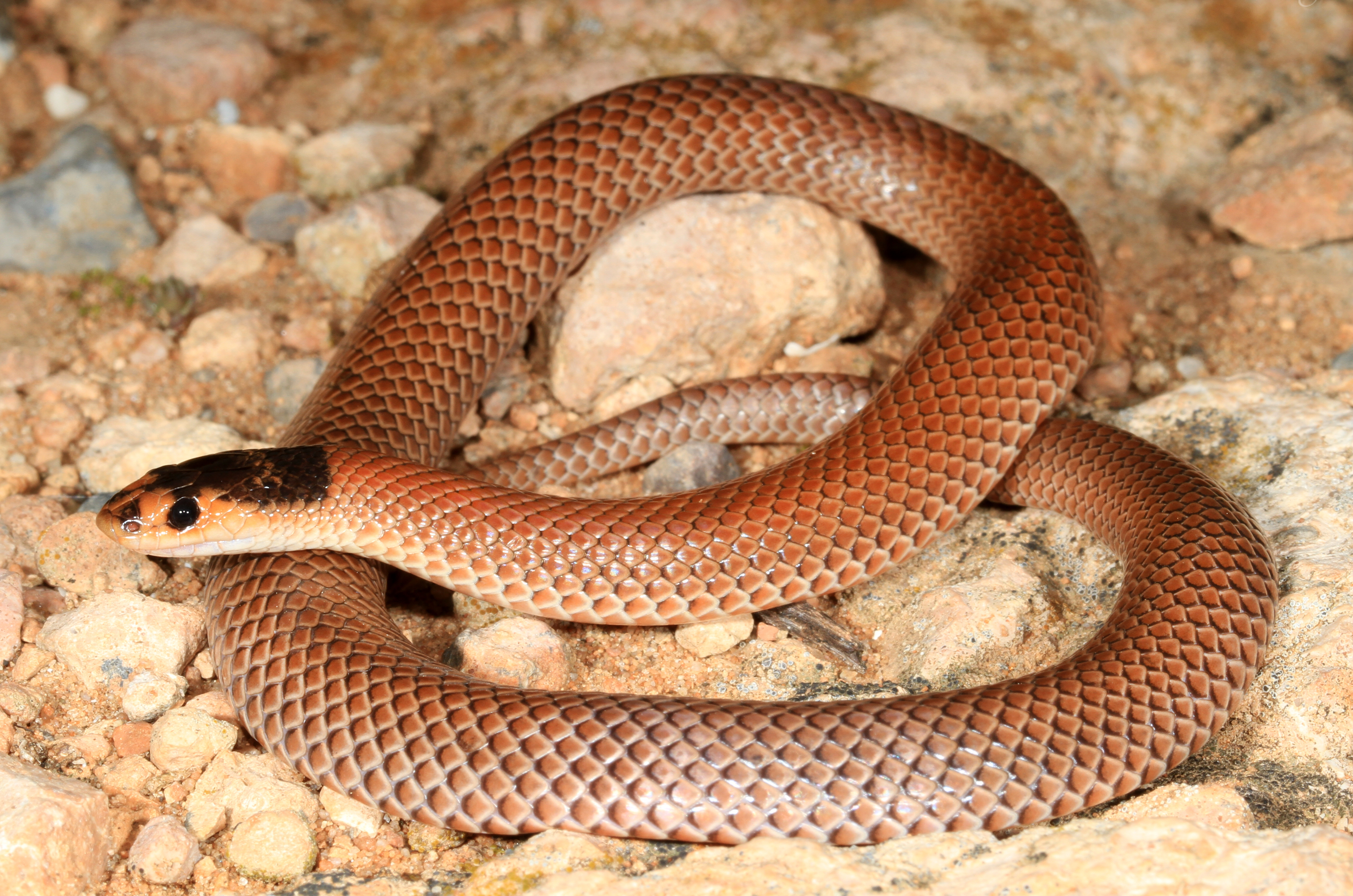

Conservation status
- Least Concern (IUCN 3.1)

Scientific classification
- Kingdom: Animalia
- Phylum: Chordata
- Class: Reptilia
- Order: Squamata
- Suborder: Serpentes
- Family: Elapidae
- Genus: Suta
- Species: S. spectabilis

Binomial name
- Suta spectabilis (Krefft, 1869)

Synonyms
- Hoplocephalus spectabilis Kreft, 1869; Denisonia spectabilis — Storr, 1981; Unechis spectabilis — Cogger, 1983; Rhinoplocephalus spectabilis — Storr, 1984; Suta spectabilis — Hutchinson, 1990; Parasuta spectabilis — Greer, 2006

= Spectacled hooded snake =

Species of snake

The spectacled hooded snake (Suta spectabilis), also known commonly as the Port Lincoln snake, is a species of venomous snake in the family Elapidae. The species is native to central-southern Australia. There are three recognized subspecies.

== Geographic range ==
S. spectabilis is found in the Australian states of New South Wales, Queensland, South Australia and Western Australia.

== Habitat ==
The preferred natural habitats of S. spectabilis are grassland and shrubland.

== Description ==
Adults of S. spectabilis have an average snout-to-vent length (SVL) of 26.5 cm (10.4 in), and the length of the tail is on average 12.5% SVL. The maximum recorded SVL is 35.6 centimetres (14.0 in).

== Reproduction ==
S. spectabilis is viviparous.

== Subspecies ==
Including the nominotypical subspecies, three subspecies are recognized as being valid.

- Suta spectabilis bushi (Storr, 1988)
- Suta spectabilis nullarbor (Storr, 1981)
- Suta spectabilis spectabilis (Krefft, 1869)

Nota bene: A trinomial authority in parentheses indicates that the subspecies was originally described in a genus other than Parasuta.

== Etymology ==
The subspecific name, bushi, is in honor of Australian herpetologist Brian Gordon Bush (born 1947).
