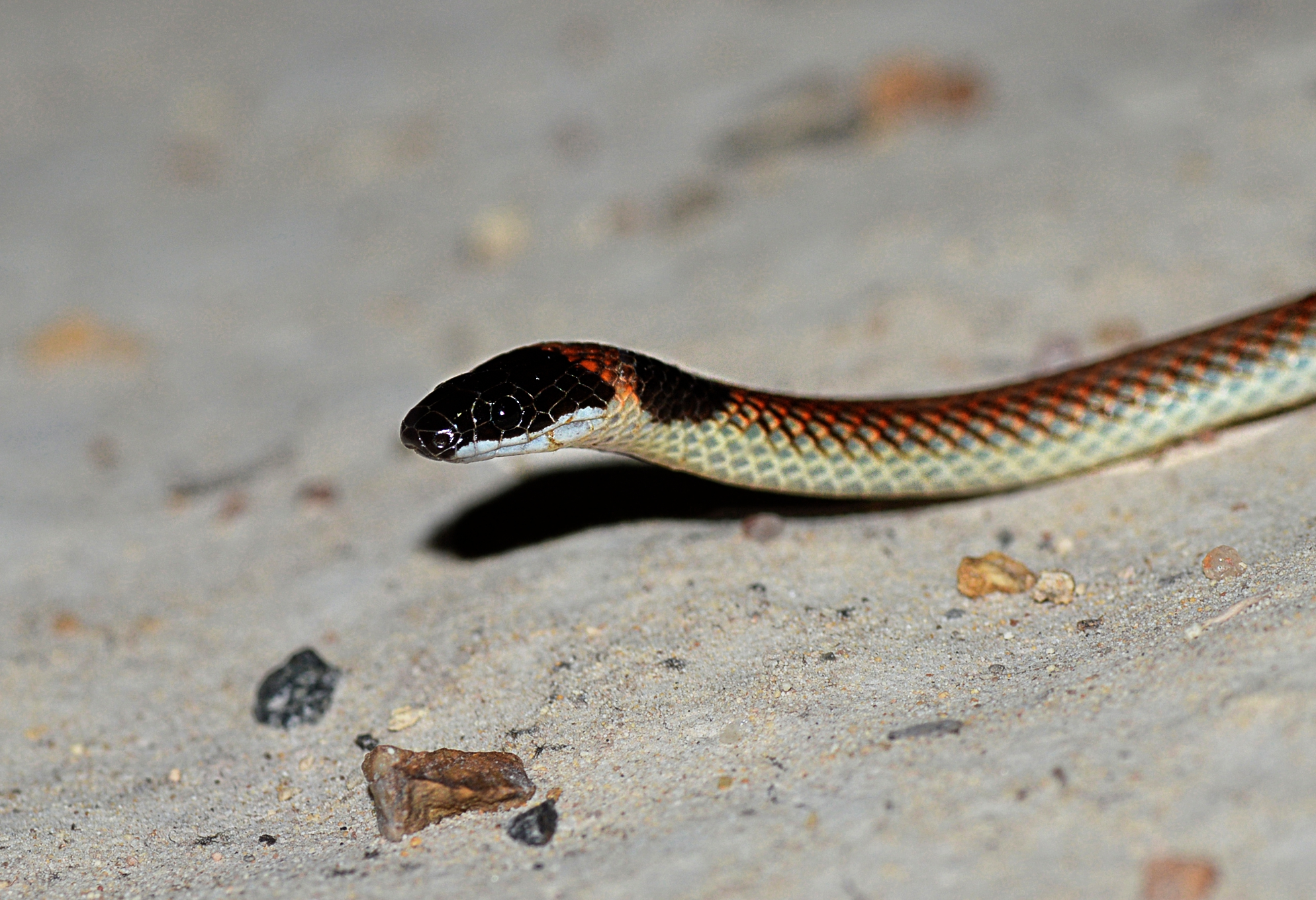

Scientific classification
- Kingdom: Animalia
- Phylum: Chordata
- Class: Reptilia
- Order: Squamata
- Suborder: Serpentes
- Family: Elapidae
- Genus: Furina
- Species: F. diadema

Binomial name
- Furina diadema Schlegel, 1837

Synonyms
- Calamaria diadema Schlegel 1837; Rabdion occipitale Girard 1825; Brachysoma diadema Günther 1863; Pseudelaps diadema Jan 1863; Cacophis blackmanii Krefft 1869; Denisonia bancrofti De Vis 1911; Pseudelaps diadema Boulenger 1896; Brachysoma diadema Worrel 1963; Aspidomorphus diadema Minton 1970; Furina diadema Cogger 1983; Furina diadema Welch 1994; Furina diadema Cogger 2000; Furina diadema Wilson & Swan 2010

= Red-naped snake =

Species of snake

The red-naped snake (Furina diadema) is a small venomous reptile of the family Elapidae. The snakes are found in four Australian states and are listed as threatened in Victoria. They are nocturnal and feed on small skinks. The young eastern brown snake is similar in appearance.

== Description ==
The red-naped snake has small black eyes and a shiny black head and neck. Its head appears to be partially flattened. On the upper lip is a streak of white. On the back of the neck there is a well-defined patch of orange or red in the shape of a diamond, crescent or oval. The belly can be either a cream colour or white. The remainder of the body is a red-brown colour. The edges of the dorsal scales are either black or dark brown and this makes the scales look like a net.

Furina diadema have a slim body and are considered a small snake. They have been reported to reach a maximum length of 40–45 centimetres (16–18 in). The males are the smaller sex. These snakes have between 160 and 210 ventral scales, a divided anal scale, between 35 and 70 subcaudal scales and generally 15 rows of mid-body scales.

=== Venom ===
Although red-naped snakes are venomous, they are considered harmless to humans. If threatened they will strike out several times with their forebody held in the air, most often with a closed mouth, but will bite if provoked enough.

=== Habitat ===
The red-naped snake is a terrestrial species that is found in many parts of eastern Australia: in dry woodlands and forests, coastal forests and heaths, tussock grasslands and shrublands. It generally stays away from wet areas, like rainforests. They shelter under rocks and fallen timber, in ant or termite nests, under wood piles, leaves, old sheets of iron, in crevices and abandoned burrows.

=== Geographic range ===
The red-naped snake is found in five Australian states and territories: Victoria, New South Wales (NSW), Queensland, South Australia and the Northern Territory. It is found in arid to humid parts, from Port Augusta in South Australia to Cairns in northern Queensland. Some areas in which they have been sighted include: the Coongie Lakes Ramsar site in South Australia; Woomargama National Park and Mullengandra in NSW Murray Catchment; in the Lower Murray darling basin, NSW; around Alice Springs in the Northern Territory; the Museum of Victoria notes this species is in the far north-west of the state, in riverine areas; and 18 national parks in Queensland.

=== Diet ===
Furina diadema prey upon little skinks.

=== Reproduction ===
The red-naped snake is oviparous. Records for clutch sizes vary: 2–5, 1–10, 3–6, 1–5, 8 and an average of 3. In subtropical regions red-naped snakes have more than one clutch in a year. They hatch out of their eggs in January, unless in a cooler region, where they hatch in February. The recorded lengths for snakes when they are first born vary from 12 cm (4.7 in) to 15 cm (5.9 in). They become adults within a year.

== Behaviour ==
The red-naped snake are a nocturnal species. Sometimes they share their space with each other. Both venom and constriction is used to kill prey. They eat more in the warmer times of the year and hunt for food in restricted places such as burrows and fissures.

== Similar species ==
The red-naped snake is similar in appearance to the juvenile eastern brown snake. The eastern brown snake has a lighter band between its dark head and the neck. These two snakes can be differentiated by their behaviour, as the eastern brown snake is out during the day, while the red-naped snake is nocturnal and not often seen unless its retreat has been disturbed.

== Conservation status ==
Furina diadema are listed as threatened in Victoria under the Flora and Fauna Guarantee Act 1988.

== Origin ==
Evidence suggests that there was a migration of Asian elapid snakes into Australia many years ago and they evolved into different genera over time, including the Furina species Furina diadema.
