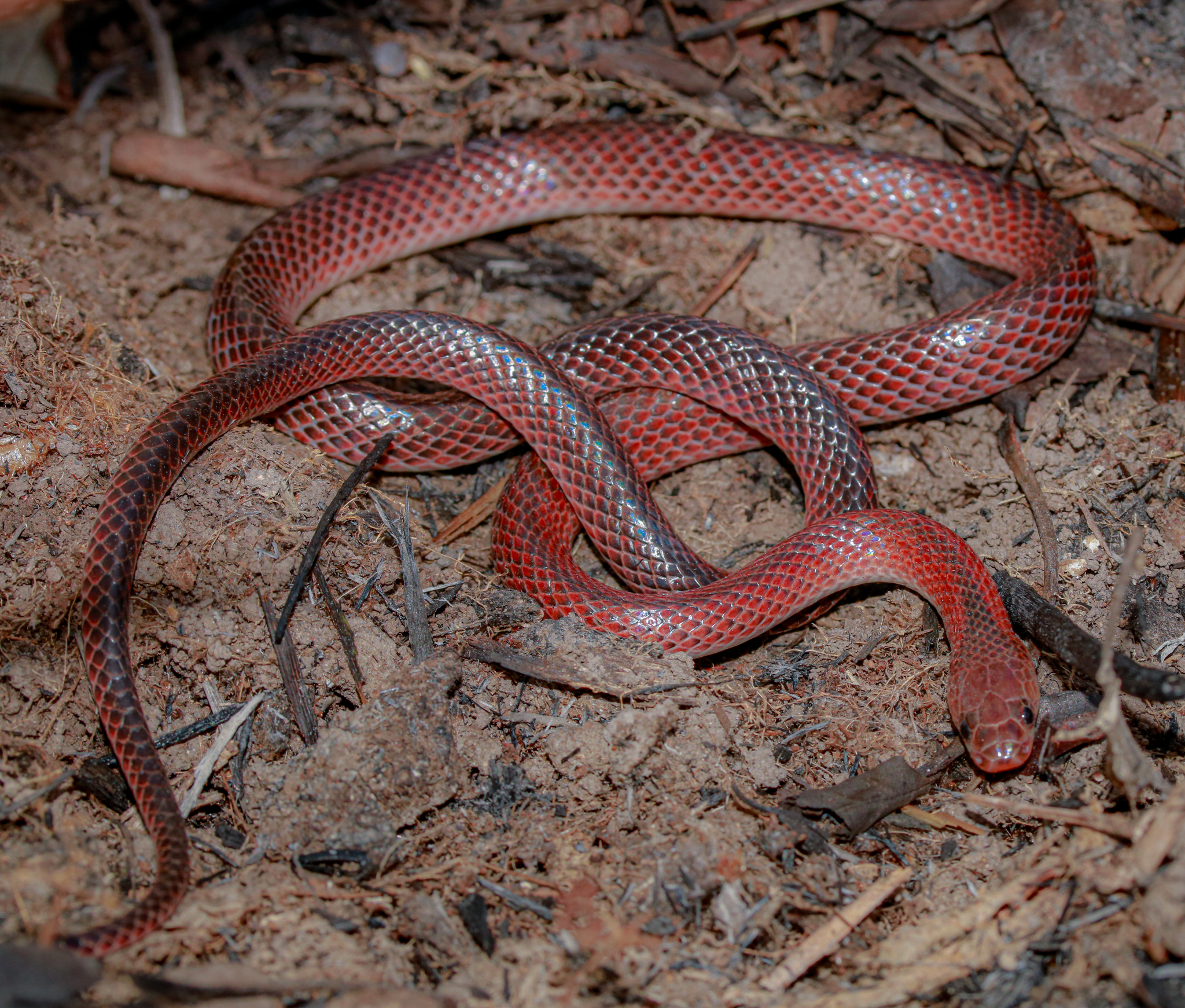

Conservation status
- Least Concern (IUCN 3.1)

Scientific classification
- Kingdom: Animalia
- Phylum: Chordata
- Class: Reptilia
- Order: Squamata
- Suborder: Serpentes
- Family: Elapidae
- Genus: Cryptophis
- Species: C. nigrostriatus

Binomial name
- Cryptophis nigrostriatus (Krefft, 1854)

Synonyms
- Hoplocephalus nigrostriatus Krefft, 1864; Alecto dorsalis Jan & Sordelli, 1873; Denisonia nigrostriata Boulenger, 1896; Parasuta nigrostriata Worrell, 1961; Suta nigrostriata Parker, 1972; Unechis nigrostriatus Cogger, 1975; Rhinoplocephalus nigrostriatus Storr, 1984; Suta nigrostriatus Shine, 1994; Unechis durhami Hoser, 2012

= Cryptophis nigrostriatus =

Species of snake

Cryptophis nigrostriatus, also known as the black-striped snake, is a species of venomous snake native to Australia and New Guinea. The specific epithet nigrostriatus ("black-striped") refers to its body markings.

== Description ==
The snake is slender and grows to an average of about 50 cm in length. The upper body is reddish-brown to pink, with a black, full-length vertebral stripe and dark head.

== Behaviour ==
The species is viviparous, with an average litter size of six.

== Distribution and habitat ==
The species occurs in the southern Western Province of Papua New Guinea, and in Australia from the northern Cape York Peninsula south-eastwards through eastern Queensland to Rockhampton. It inhabits dry woodlands. The type locality is near Rockhampton.
