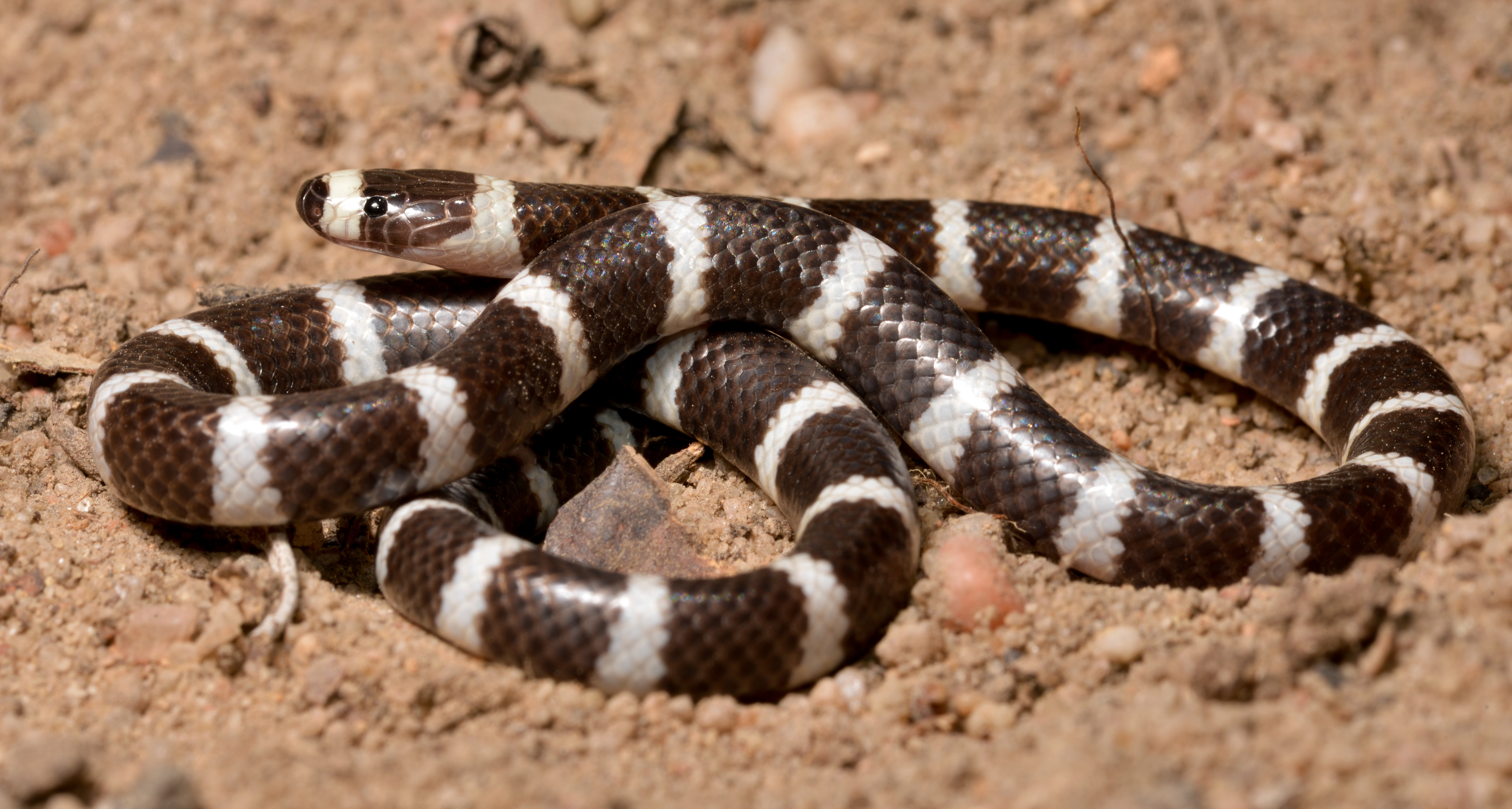
- Vermicella annulata, bandy-bandy

Scientific classification
- Kingdom: Animalia
- Phylum: Chordata
- Class: Reptilia
- Order: Squamata
- Suborder: Serpentes
- Family: Elapidae
- Subfamily: Hydrophiinae; Fitzinger, 1843
- Distribution range for Hydrophiinae

= Hydrophiinae =

Subfamily of venomous snakes

Hydrophiinae is a subfamily of venomous snakes in the family Elapidae. It contains most sea snakes and many genera of venomous land snakes found in Australasia, such as the taipans (Oxyuranus), tiger snakes (Notechis), brown snakes (Pseudonaja) and death adders (Acanthophis).

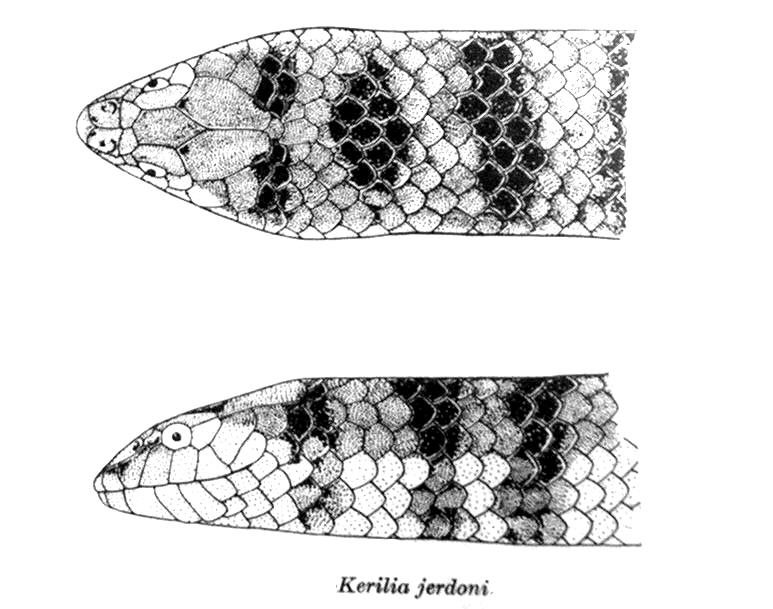
Hydrophis jerdonii, Jerdon's sea snake

== Taxonomy ==
=== Phylogeny and classification ===
Historically, subfamily Hydrophiinae included all "sea snakes" and was commonly used to refer to both the true sea snakes (tribe Hydrophiini) and the sea kraits (Laticauda). However, large-scale molecular phylogenetic analyses and studies integrating phenotypic data (including morphological, ecological, and cytogenetic characteristics) with molecular data support the hypothesis that Laticauda is the sister group to all other hydrophiines. This clade containing all hydrophiines except Laticauda is sometimes referred to as Oxyuraninae. Given its basal position, Laticauda is sometimes placed in a separate subfamily, Laticaudinae, sister to Hydrophiinae sensu stricto.

Molecular evidence further suggests that true sea snakes (Hydrophiini) are more closely related to terrestrial oxyuranine elapids than to Laticauda, implying that marine adaptations evolved convergently in the two groups. Sanders et al. (2008) identified the closest extant relatives of Hydrophiini as Australasian terrestrial elapids. Maximum likelihood analysis suggested that Hemiaspis, a semi-aquatic genus known as "swamp snakes," is sister to sea snakes. In contrast, maximum parsimony analysis in the same study recovered Hydrophiini as sister to a broader Notechis group, including genera such as Hoplocephalus, Paroplocephalus, Tropidechis, Notechis, Austrelaps, Drysdalia, and Echiopsis. Although subsequent phylogenetic efforts have focused on relationships within Hydrophiini, broader genomic sampling across Hydrophiinae may further clarify these interrelationships. Despite uncertainty surrounding the broader relationships within Hydrophiinae, Sanders et al. (2008) presented strong molecular support for the monophyly of Hydrophiini, the "true sea snakes." This group is characterized by two morphological synapomorphies: dorsally oriented nostrils located posteriorly, and nostrils sealable by fleshy valvular flaps.

=== Genera ===
According to the Reptile Database, Hydrophiinae contains the following 38 genera: (Sea snakes are marked with asterisks.)

- Acanthophis
- Aipysurus*
- Antaioserpens
- Aspidomorphus
- Austrelaps
- Brachyurophis
- Cacophis
- Cryptophis
- Demansia
- Denisonia
- Drysdalia
- Echiopsis
- Elapognathus
- Emydocephalus*
- Ephalophis*
- Furina
- Hemiaspis
- Hoplocephalus
- Hydrelaps*
- Hydrophis*
- Loveridgelaps
- Microcephalophis
- Micropechis
- Neelaps
- Notechis
- Ogmodon
- Oxyuranus
- Parahydrophis*
- Parapistocalamus
- Paroplocephalus
- Pseudechis
- Pseudonaja
- Rhinoplocephalus
- Salomonelaps
- Simoselaps
- Suta
- Toxicocalamus
- Tropidechis
- Vermicella
