= Cryptophis incredibilis =

Conservation status
- Least Concern (IUCN 3.1)

Scientific classification
- Kingdom: Animalia
- Phylum: Chordata
- Class: Reptilia
- Order: Squamata
- Suborder: Serpentes
- Family: Elapidae
- Genus: Cryptophis
- Species: C. incredibilis

Binomial name
- Cryptophis incredibilis (Wells & Wellington, 1985)

Synonyms
- Unechis incredibilis Wells & Wellington, 1985; Rhinoplocephalus incredibilis Cogger, 2000

Species of snake

Cryptophis incredibilis, also known as the pink snake, is a species of venomous snake that is endemic to Australia. The specific epithet incredibilis ("incredible") is presumed to refer to its unusual colouration.

== Description ==
The upper body of the snake is a uniform pink, with a white belly. It is a slender snake which grows to an average of about 40 cm in length.

== Behaviour ==
The snake is viviparous.

== Distribution and habitat ==
The species' distribution is limited to Prince of Wales Island, in Torres Strait, in the far north of Queensland, where it inhabits woodland on sandy soils.
