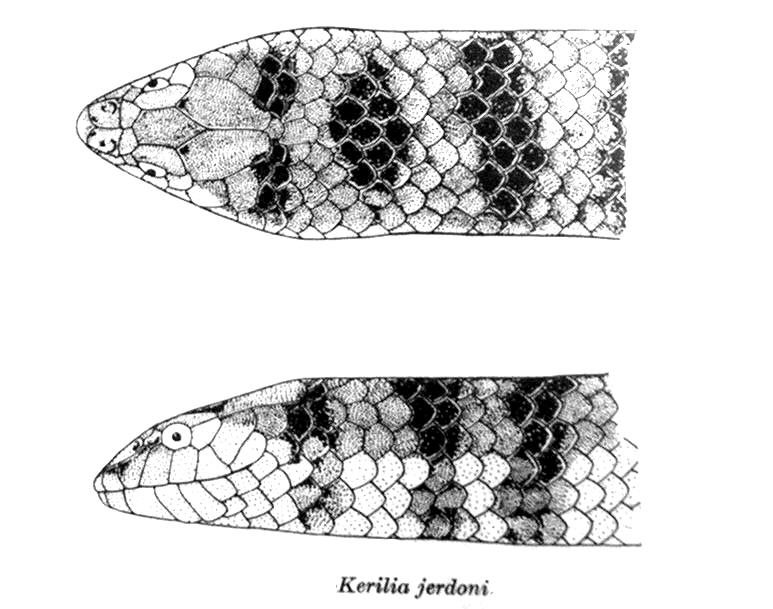

Conservation status
- Least Concern (IUCN 3.1)

Scientific classification
- Kingdom: Animalia
- Phylum: Chordata
- Class: Reptilia
- Order: Squamata
- Suborder: Serpentes
- Family: Elapidae
- Genus: Hydrophis
- Species: H. jerdonii

Binomial name
- Hydrophis jerdonii (Gray, 1849)

Synonyms
- Kerilia jerdonii Gray, 1849; Hydrophis jerdonii — J. Anderson, 1871; Distira jerdonii — Boulenger, 1896; Kerilia jerdoni [sic] — Wall, 1921; Hydrophis jerdonii — Sanders et al., 2012

= Jerdon's sea snake =

Species of snake

Jerdon's sea snake (Hydrophis jerdonii) is a species of venomous sea snake in the subfamily Hydrophiinae of the family Elapidae. The species is native to the Indian Ocean.

== Etymology ==
The specific name, jerdonii, is in honor of British zoologist Thomas C. Jerdon.

== Description ==
See snake scales for terms used

M.A. Smith (1943) describes the species as follows: Head short, snout declivous and much narrowed anteriorly; eye moderate; rostral as high as broad; prefrontals small, usually not in contact with the supralabials; frontal much longer than broad, nearly as long as its distance from the end of the snout: 1 pre- and 1 postocular; 6 supralabials, the last often confluent with the single anterior temporal, the 3rd and 4th touching the eye: 7–8 infralabials, the first three in contact with the genitals, both pairs of which are well developed and in contact with one another.

17 [dorsal] scale-rows on the neck. 21 or 23, rarely 19, at mid-body, imbricate and strongly keeled; Ventrals 225–253 for specimens from the coasts of India and Gulf of Siam; 247-278 for 11 examples from Cap St. Jacques and S. Annam (fide Bourret, p. 25).

Hemipenis forked near the tip; it is spinose throughout, the spines being of moderate size, closely set and becoming slightly larger as they approach the proximal end.

Olive above, yellowish or white beneath, with black dorsal spots or rhombs which extend round the body to form complete bands in the young; intermediate dorsal spots or bars are usually present. Examples from the Bay of Bengal have 19 or 21 scales at mid-body and the dorsal bars number from 30 to 38 (typical form). Examples from the Gulf of Siam have usually 21 or 23 scales at mid-body and the dorsal bars number from 34 (K. j. siamensis).

Total length: 1 m (3.3 ft), tail 10 cm (3.9 in).

== Distribution ==
Indian Ocean (Bangladesh, Sri Lanka, India, Myanmar (Burma), Mergui Archipelago), Coast of Taiwan, South China Sea, Bay of Bengal (to Sri Lanka), along coasts of W Malaysia to Gulf of Thailand, Gulf of Siam, Indonesia (Borneo).

Race siamensis: Gulf of Thailand.

Type locality: Madras, India.

== Habitat ==
The preferred natural habitat of H. jerdonii is shallow marine waters with mud, sand, or gravel bottoms, at depths not greater than 30 m (98 ft).

== Diet ==
H. jerdonii preys upon eels and lizardfishes.

== Reproduction ==
H. jerdonii is ovoviviparous. Litter size is four young.

== Other sources ==
- Boulenger GA (1890). The Fauna of British India, Including Ceylon and Burma. Reptilia and Batrachia. London: Secretary of State for India in Council. (Taylor and Francis, printers). xviii + 541 pp. (Distira jerdonii, pp. 408–409).
- Boulenger GA (1896). Catalogue of the Snakes in the British Museum (Natural History). Volume III., Containing the Colubridæ (Opisthoglyphæ and Proteroglyphæ) .... London: Trustees of the British Museum (Natural History). (Taylor and Francis, printers). xiv + 727 pp. + Plates I–XXV. (Distira jerdonii, p. 299).
- Gray JE (1849). Catalogue of the Specimens of Snakes in the British Museum. London: Trustees of the British Museum. (Edward Newman, printer). xv + 125 pp. (Kerilia jerdonii, new species, p. 57).
- Günther ACLG (1864). The Reptiles of British India. London: The Ray Society. (Taylor and Francis, printers). xxvii + 452 pp. + Plates I–XXVI. (Hydrophis jerdonii, pp. 362–363 + Plate XXV, figure B).
- Rasmussen AR, Andersen M (1990). "The sea snake Kerilia jerdoni Gray (1849): First records from Andaman Sea, Phuket Island, Thailand, with remarks on the two subspecies". The Snake 22: 131–133.
- Wall F (1921). Ophidia Taprobanica or the Snakes of Ceylon. Colombo, Ceylon [Sri Lanka]: Colombo Museum. (H.R. Cottle, Government Printer). xxii + 581 pp. ("Kerilia jerdoni [sic]", pp. 386–390, Figure 73).
