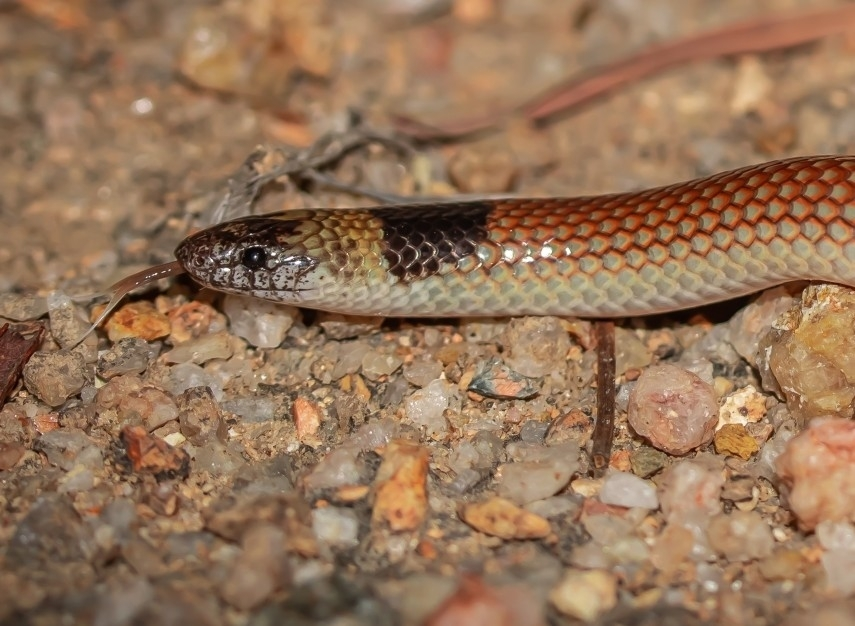

Conservation status
- Least Concern (IUCN 3.1)

Scientific classification
- Kingdom: Animalia
- Phylum: Chordata
- Class: Reptilia
- Order: Squamata
- Suborder: Serpentes
- Family: Elapidae
- Genus: Antaioserpens
- Species: A. albiceps

Binomial name
- Antaioserpens albiceps Boulenger, 1898

= Northeastern plain-nosed burrowing snake =

Species of snake

The northeastern plain-nosed burrowing snake (Antaioserpens albiceps) is a species of snake native to far north Queensland.
