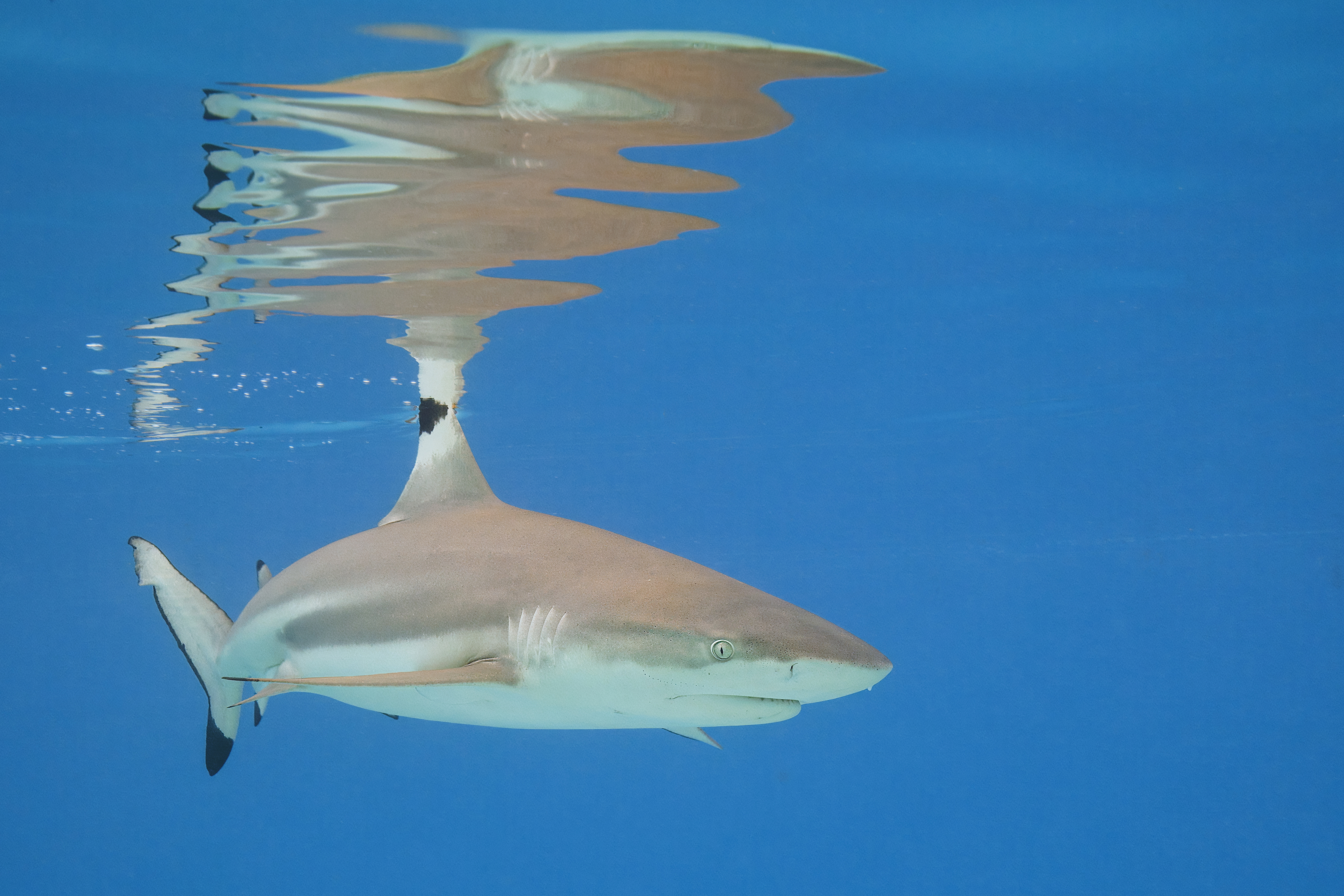
- Moorea, French Polynesia

Conservation status
- Vulnerable (IUCN 3.1)
- CITES Appendix II

Scientific classification
- Kingdom: Animalia
- Phylum: Chordata
- Class: Chondrichthyes
- Subclass: Elasmobranchii
- Division: Selachii
- Order: Carcharhiniformes
- Family: Carcharhinidae
- Genus: Carcharhinus
- Species: C. melanopterus

Binomial name
- Carcharhinus melanopterus (Quoy & Gaimard, 1824)
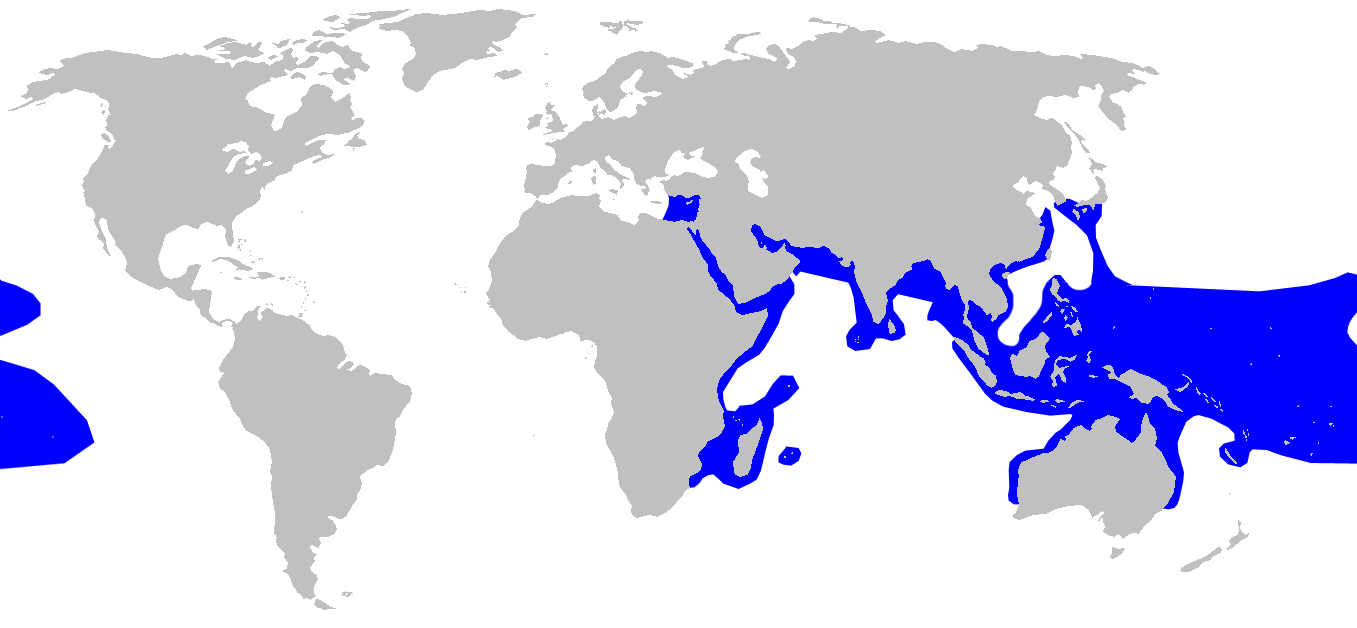
- Range of the blacktip reef shark

Synonyms
- Carcharias elegans Ehrenberg, 1871; Carcharias marianensis Engelhardt, 1912; Carcharias melanopterus Quoy & Gaimard, 1824; Carcharias playfairii Günther, 1870; Squalus carcharias minor Forsskål, 1775; Squalus commersonii* Blainville, 1816; Squalus ustus* Duméril, 1824 * ambiguous synonym

= Blacktip reef shark =

Species of shark

The blacktip reef shark (Carcharhinus melanopterus) is a species of requiem shark, in the family Carcharhinidae, which can be easily identified by the prominent black tips on its fins (especially on the first dorsal fin and its caudal fin). Among the most abundant sharks inhabiting the tropical coral reefs of the Indian and Pacific Oceans, this species prefers shallow, inshore waters. Its exposed first dorsal fin is a common sight in the region. The blacktip reef shark is usually found over reef ledges and sandy flats, though it has also been known to enter brackish and freshwater environments. It typically attains a length of 1.6 m (5.2 ft). Like other sharks, the females are larger than the males.

The blacktip reef shark has extremely small home ranges and exhibits strong site fidelity, remaining within the same local area for up to several years at a time. It is an active predator of small bony fish, cephalopods, and crustaceans, and has also been known to feed on sea snakes and seabirds. Accounts of the blacktip reef shark's life history have been variable and sometimes contradictory, in part reflecting geographical differences within the species. Like other members of its family, this shark is viviparous, with females giving birth to two to five young on a biennial, annual, or possibly biannual cycle. Reports of the gestation period range from 7–9, through 10–11, to possibly 16 months. Mating is preceded by the male following closely behind the female, likely attracted by her chemical signals. Newborn sharks are found further inshore and in shallower water than adults, frequently roaming in large groups over areas flooded by high tide.

Timid and skittish, the blacktip reef shark is difficult to approach and seldom poses a danger to humans unless roused by food. However, people wading through shallow water are at risk of having their legs mistakenly bitten. This shark is used for its meat, fins, and liver oil, but is not considered to be a commercially significant species. The International Union for Conservation of Nature has assessed the blacktip reef shark as Vulnerable. Although the species as a whole remains widespread and relatively common, overfishing of this slow-reproducing shark has led to its decline at a number of locales.

== Taxonomy ==
French naturalists Jean René Constant Quoy and Joseph Paul Gaimard originally described the blacktip reef shark during the 1817–1820 exploratory voyage of the corvette Uranie. In 1824, their account was published as part of Voyage autour du monde...sur les corvettes de S.M. l'Uranie et la Physicienne, Louis de Freycinet's 13-volume report on the voyage. The type specimen was a 59 cm (23 in)-long juvenile male caught off the island of Waigeo, west of New Guinea. Quoy and Gaimard chose the name Carcharias melanopterus, from the Greek melas meaning "black" and pteron meaning "fin" or "wing", in reference to this shark's prominent fin markings.

Subsequent authors moved the blacktip reef shark to the genus Carcharhinus; in 1965 the International Commission on Zoological Nomenclature designated it as the type species for the genus. In some earlier literature, the scientific name of this shark was mistakenly given as C. spallanzani, now recognized as a synonym of the spottail shark (C. sorrah). Other common names for this species include blackfin reef shark, black-finned shark, blacktip shark, reef blacktip shark, and guliman.

== Phylogeny ==
Like most other members of its genus, the phylogenetic position of the blacktip reef shark remains indeterminate. Based on morphology, Jack Garrick proposed in 1982 that the closest relative of the blacktip reef shark was the nervous shark (C. cautus). Leonard Compagno's 1988 morphological analysis suggested affinity not only between this species and the nervous shark, but also four other species, and could not resolve their relationships further. A 1998 allozyme analysis by Gavin Naylor again yielded ambiguous results, finding that the blacktip reef shark forms a polytomy (irresolvable group) with 10 other Carcharhinus species.

== Distribution and habitat ==
The blacktip reef shark is found throughout nearshore waters of the tropical and subtropical Indo-Pacific. In the Indian Ocean, it occurs from South Africa to the Red Sea, including Madagascar, Mauritius, and the Seychelles, and from there eastward along the coast of the Indian subcontinent to Southeast Asia, including Sri Lanka, the Andaman Islands, and the Maldives. In the Pacific Ocean, it is found from southern China and the Philippines to Indonesia, northern Australia and New Caledonia, and also inhabits numerous oceanic islands, including the Marshall, Gilbert, Society, and Hawaiian Islands and Tuamotu. Contrary to what most sources state, there is a report suggesting that the specimens of this species from Japanese waters might be from Taiwan, however a number of sightings and captures of this species have been reported from the inshore waters of Ishigaki Island of Okinawa Prefecture in southern Japan. A Lessepsian migrant, this shark has colonized the eastern Mediterranean Sea by way of the Suez Canal.

Although it has been reported from a depth of 75 m (246 ft), the blacktip reef shark is usually found in water only a few meters deep, and can often be seen swimming close to shore with its dorsal fin exposed. Younger sharks prefer shallow, sandy flats, while older sharks are most common around reef ledges and can also be found near reef drop-offs. This species has also been reported from brackish estuaries and lakes in Madagascar, and freshwater environments in Malaysia, though it is not able to tolerate low salinity to the same degree as the bull shark (C. leucas). At Aldabra in the Indian Ocean, blacktip reef sharks congregate in the channels between reef flats during low tide and travel to the mangroves when the water rises. There is equivocal evidence that sharks from the northern and southern extremes of its distribution are migratory.

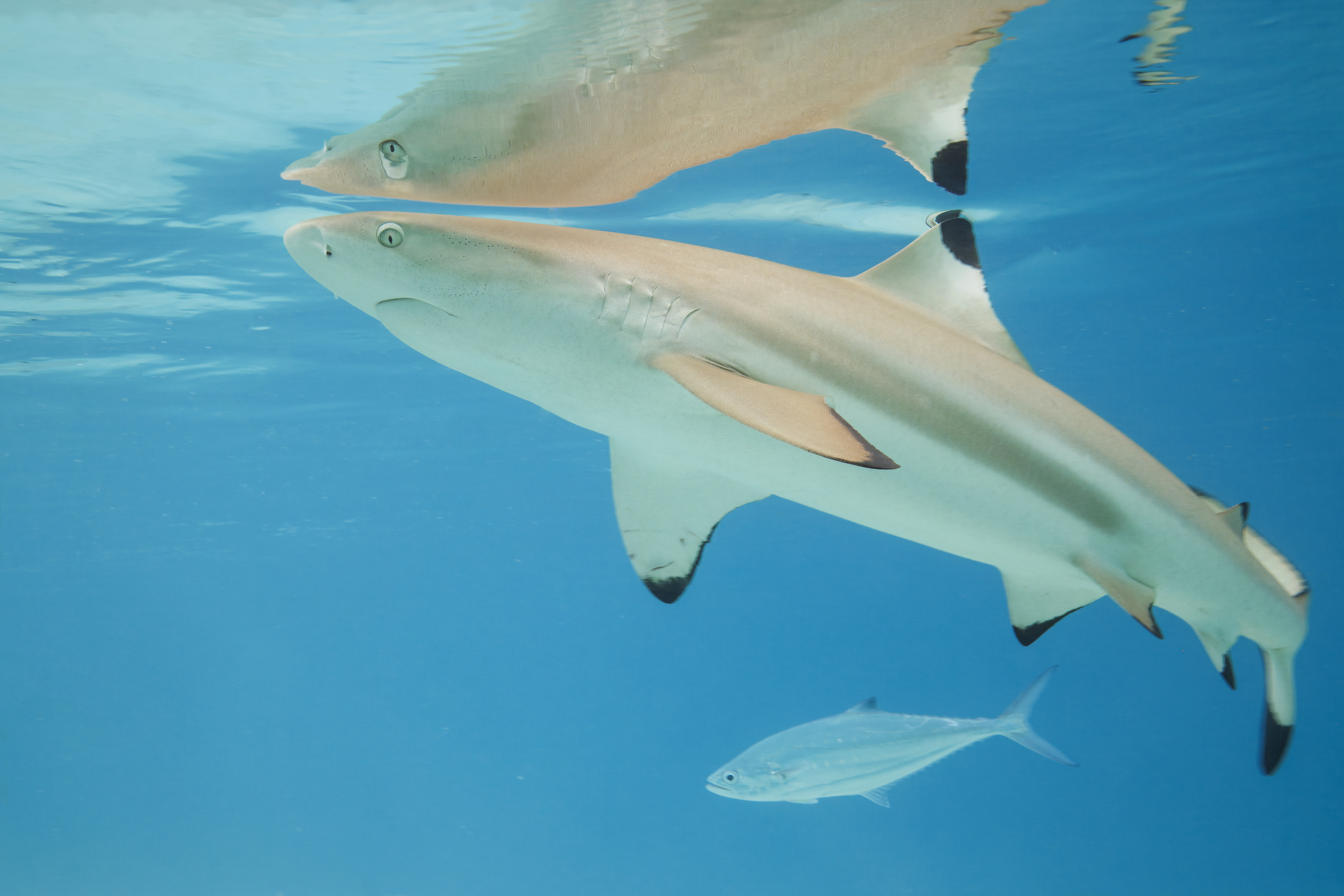

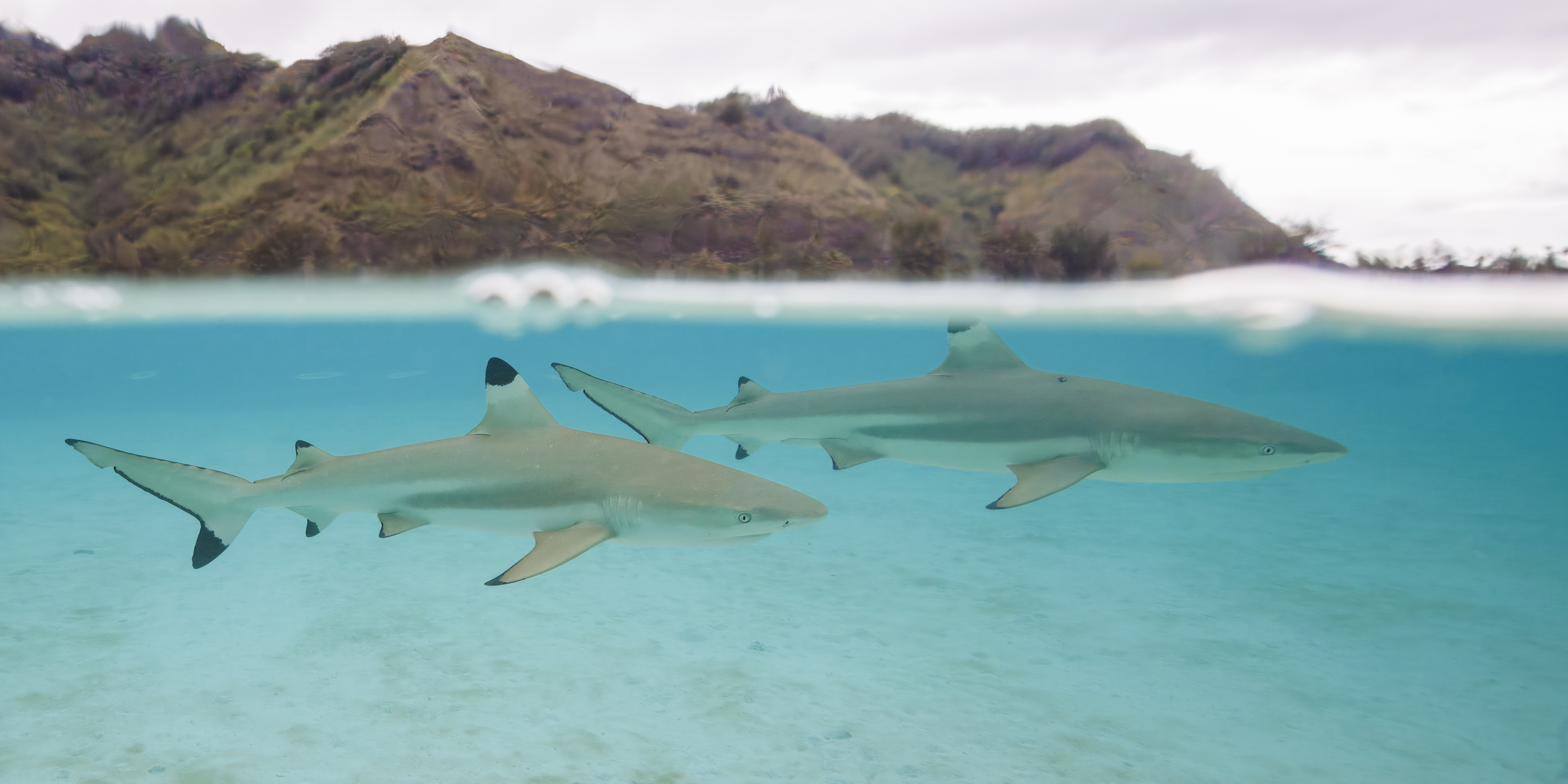

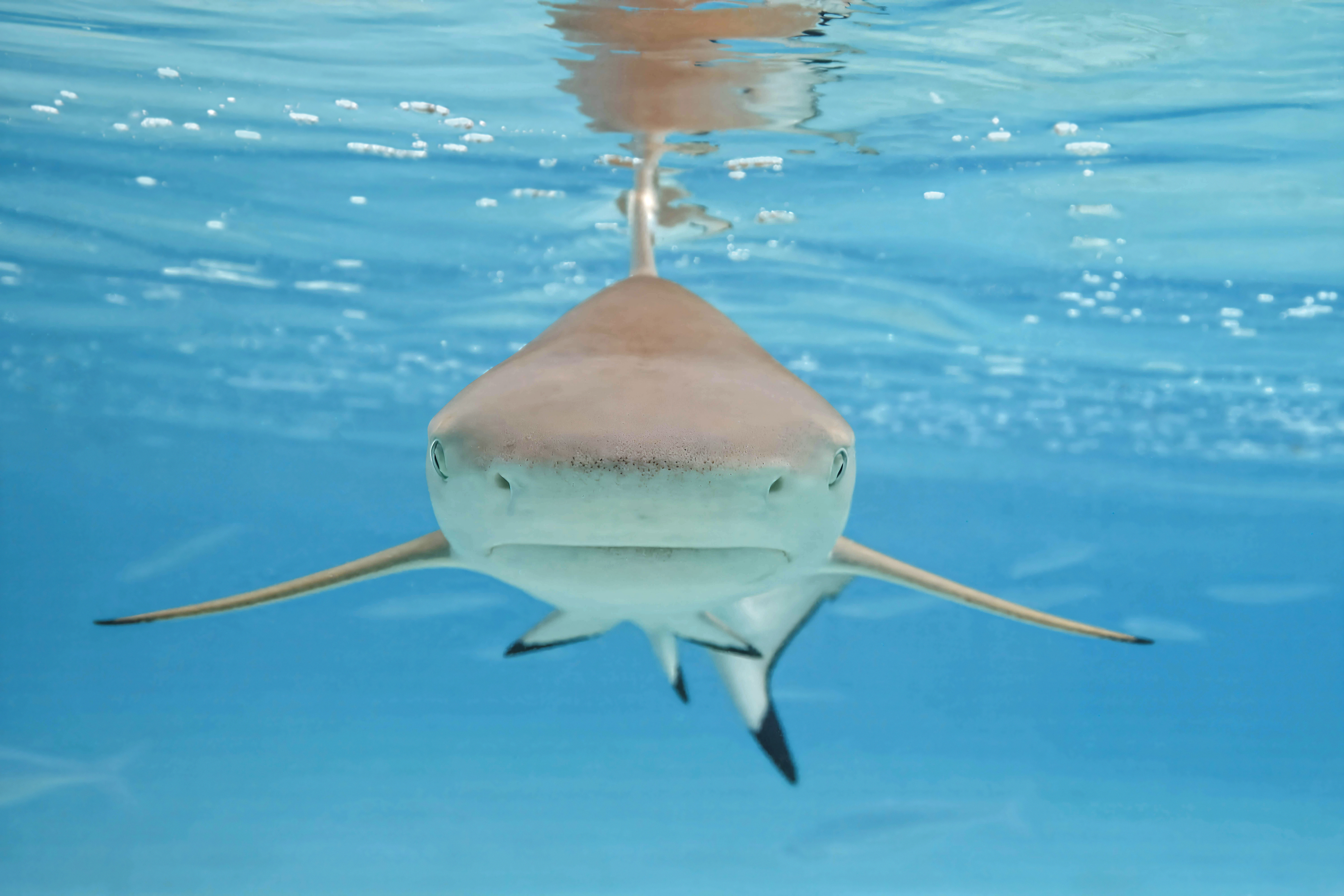

Blacktip reef sharks in a Japanese aquarium, 2010

== Description ==
A robustly built species with a streamlined "typical shark" form, the blacktip reef shark has a short, wide, rounded snout and moderately large, oval eyes. Each nostril has a flap of skin in front that is expanded into a nipple-shaped lobe. Not counting small symphysial (central) teeth, the tooth rows number 11–13 (usually 12) on either side of the upper jaw and 10–12 (usually 11) on either side of the lower jaw. The upper teeth are upright to angled and narrowly triangular in shape, bearing serrations that are more coarse on the bases; the lower teeth are similar, but more finely serrated. The teeth of adult males are more abruptly curved than those of females.

The pectoral fins are large and narrowly falcate (sickle-shaped), tapering to points. The sizable first dorsal fin is high with a curving S-shaped rear margin, and originates over the free rear tips of the pectoral fins. The second dorsal fin is relatively large with a short rear margin, and is placed opposite the anal fin. There is no ridge between the dorsal fins. This shark is a pale grayish-brown above and white below, with an obvious white band on the sides extending forward from above the anal fin. All the fins have black tips highlighted by lighter-colored borders, which are especially striking on the first dorsal fin and lower caudal fin lobe. Most blacktip reef sharks are no more than 1.6 m (5.2 ft) long, though rarely individuals may reach 1.8 m (5.9 ft) or possibly 2.0 m (6.6 ft). The maximum weight on record with the International Game Fish Association is 13.6 kg (30 lb).

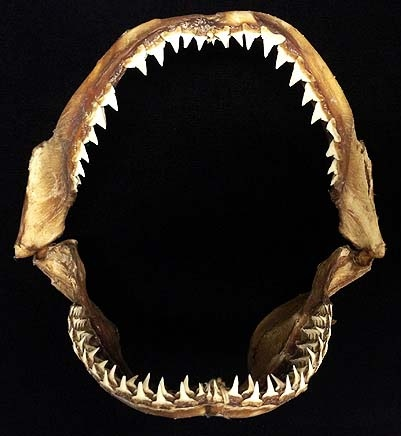
Jaws

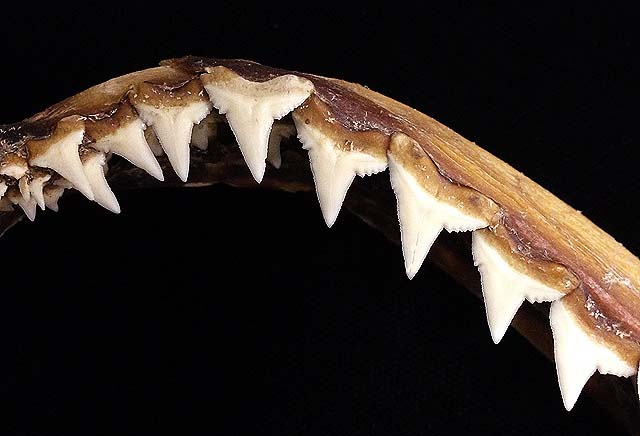
Upper teeth

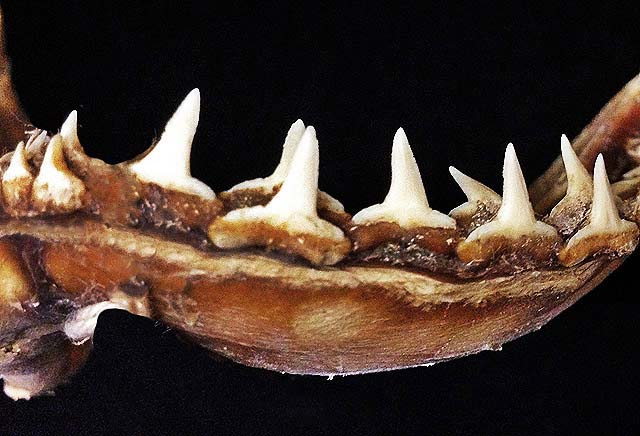
Lower teeth

== Biology and ecology ==
Aerial view of a blacktip reef shark (Carcharhinus melanopterus) at Lady Musgrave Island, Queensland, Australia.

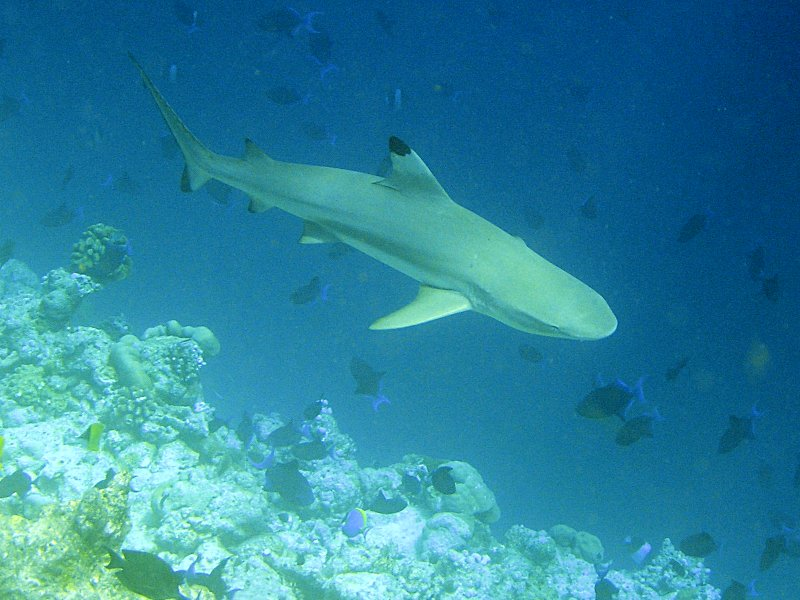
Adult blacktip reef sharks are often found patrolling reef ledges.

Along with the grey reef shark (C. amblyrhinchos) and the whitetip reef shark (Triaenodon obesus), the blacktip reef shark is one of the three most common sharks inhabiting coral reefs in the Indo-Pacific. This species predominates in shallow habitats, while the other two are mostly found deeper. Fast-swimming and active, the blacktip reef shark may be encountered alone or in small groups; large "social" aggregations have also been observed. For the most part, juvenile and adult sharks are not segregated by sex, save for the movements of pregnant females to give birth. Individuals exhibit strong fidelity to particular areas, where they may remain for several years.

A tracking study off Palmyra Atoll in the central Pacific has found the blacktip reef shark has a home range of around 0.55 km^{2} (0.21 mi^{2}), among the smallest of any shark species. The size and location of the range does not change with time of day. Within this range, 3–17% of the area constitute favored hunting patches that are disproportionately occupied by the resident shark. The sharks spend most of their time swimming back and forth along reef ledges, making occasional short forays onto sandy flats. Their average swimming speed decreases when the tide rises at night, possibly because the influx of cooler water reduces their metabolism, or the accompanying movement of prey fishes makes foraging easier. Blacktip reef sharks at Aldabra tend to be more mobile than those at Palmyra, with recorded individual movements of up to 2.5 km (1.6 mi) over 7 hours.

Blacktip reef sharks, particularly small individuals, fall prey to larger fishes, including groupers, grey reef sharks, tiger sharks (Galeocerdo cuvier), and members of their own species. At Palmyra Atoll, adults avoid patrolling tiger sharks by staying out of the central, deeper lagoon. Their known parasites include the tapeworms Anthobothrium lesteri, Nybelinia queenslandensis, Otobothrium alexanderi, and Platybothrium jondoeorum, a myxosporidian in the genus Unicapsula, and the monogenean Dermophthirius melanopteri. One of the few documented examples of infectious disease in a shark was a fatal case of hemorrhagic septicemia in a blacktip reef shark, caused by the bacterium Aeromonas salmonicida subsp. salmonicida.

=== Feeding ===
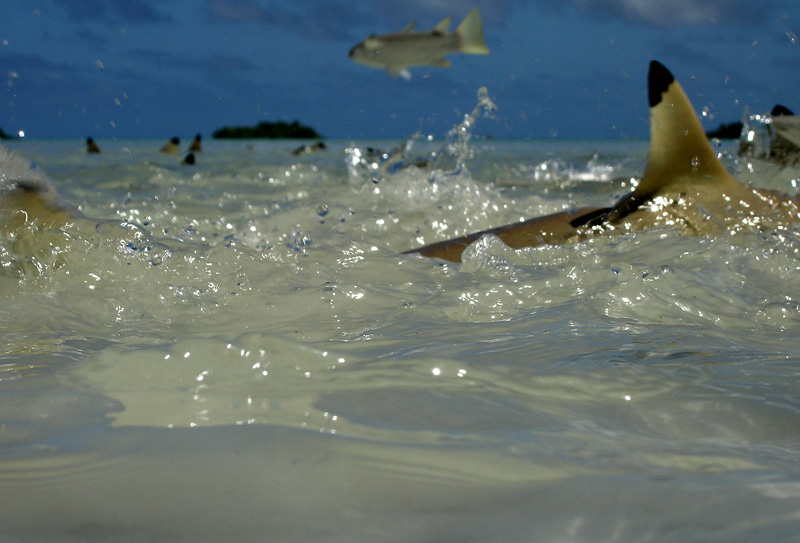
The primary food of the blacktip reef shark is small fish, such as mullet.

As often the most abundant apex predator within its ecosystem, the blacktip reef shark plays a major role in structuring inshore ecological communities. Its diet is composed primarily of small teleost fishes, including mullet, groupers, grunters, jacks, mojarras, wrasses, surgeonfish, and smelt-whitings. Groups of blacktip reef sharks in the Indian Ocean have been observed herding schools of mullet against the shore for easier feeding. Squid, octopus, cuttlefish, other molluscs, shrimp, mantis shrimp, and crabs are also taken, as well as carrion and smaller sharks and rays, though this is rare. Off northern Australia, this species is known to consume sea snakes, including Acrochordus granulatus, Hydrelaps darwiniensis, Hydrophis spp. and Lapemis hardwickii. Sharks off Palmyra Atoll have been documented preying on seabird chicks that have fallen out of their nests into the water. Miscellaneous items that have been found inside the stomachs of this species include algae, turtle grass, coral, hydrozoa, bryozoa, rats, and stones.

Researchers working at Enewetak Atoll in the Marshall Islands have found the blacktip reef shark can be readily attracted by splashing or striking metal tools against hard objects underwater, as well as by the scent of both healthy and injured fish. As with most sharks, the blacktip reef shark does not have any cone cells in its retina, limiting its ability to discriminate colors and fine details. Instead, its vision is adapted for sensitivity to movement or contrast under low light conditions, which is further enhanced by the presence of a reflective tapetum lucidum. Experiments have shown that this shark is capable of detecting small objects up to 1.5–3 m (5–10 ft) away, but is unable to clearly discern the shape of the object. Electroreception is another means by which this shark can locate prey; its ampullae of Lorenzini have a sensitivity of approximately 4 nV/cm and an effective range of 25 cm (10 in). Similar to the grey reef shark, this species becomes more excited and "confident" in the presence of other individuals of its species, and in extreme situations can be roused into a feeding frenzy. Feeding activity may be greater at night than during the day.

== Life history ==
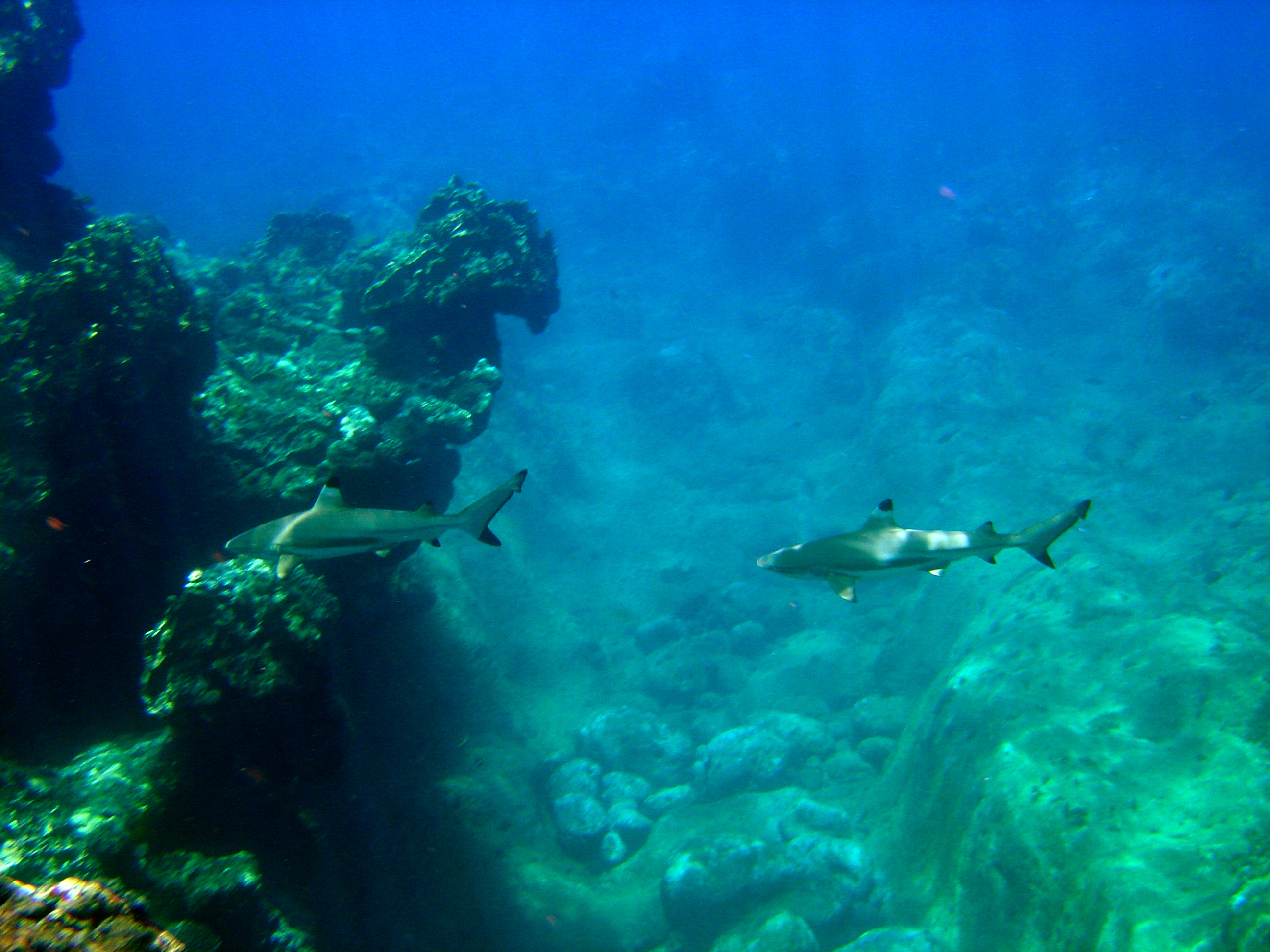
Blacktip reef sharks follow each other as a prelude to mating.

Like the other members of its family, the blacktip reef shark is viviparous, though the details of its life history vary across its range. Its reproductive cycle is annual off northern Australia, with mating taking place from January to February, as well as off Moorea in French Polynesia, where mating occurs from November to March. The cycle is biennial off Aldabra, where intense competition within and between species for food may constrain females to only bearing young every other year. Earlier accounts from the Indian Ocean by Johnson (1978), Madagascar by Fourmanoir (1961), and the Red Sea by Gohar and Mazhar (1964), indicated a biannual cycle in these regions with two breeding seasons per year from June to July and December to January. If accurate, the shorter reproductive cycles of these subpopulations may be a consequence of warmer water.

When receptive to mating, a female blacktip reef shark swims slowly in a sinusoidal pattern near the bottom with her head pointed down; observations in the wild suggest female sharks release chemical signals that allow males to track them. Once the male finds her, he closes to around 15 cm (5.9 in) and follows her with his snout oriented towards her vent. A courting male may also bite the female behind her gills or on her pectoral fins; these mating wounds heal completely after 4–6 weeks. After a period of synchronous swimming, the male pushes the female on her side and positions her so her head is against the bottom and her tail is raised. Once the female is in position, the male inserts one of his claspers into her cloaca. Copulation lasts for several minutes, after which the sharks separate and resume their regular behavior. Off Moorea, individual older females mate and give birth at a consistent time every year, often to within a week's precision, whereas younger females exhibit more variability in their timing. Younger females are also more likely to fail to become pregnant after mating.

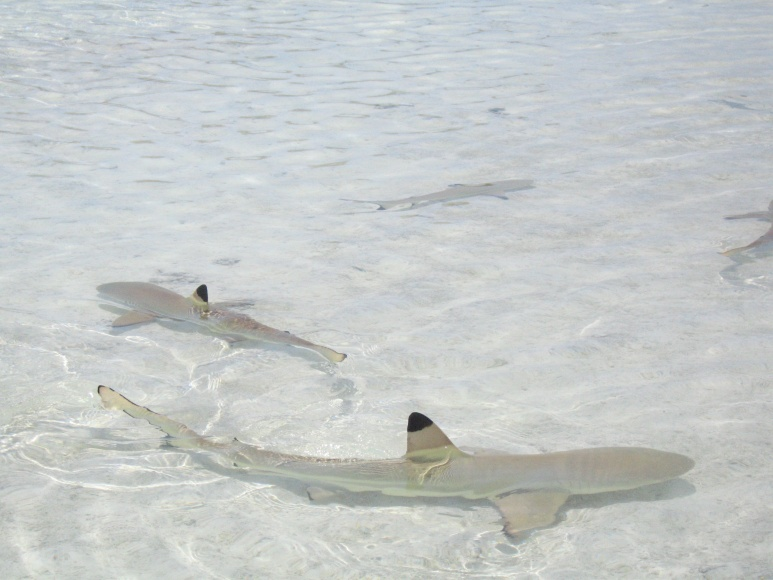
Young blacktip reef sharks frequent very shallow, sandy flats.

The gestation period has been reported as 10–11 months long in the Indian Ocean and Pacific islands, and 7–9 months long off northern Australia. Earlier authors, such as Melouk (1957), have estimated a gestation period as long as 16 months, though the validity of this figure has subsequently been challenged. The female has a single functional ovary (on the right) and two functional uteruses, divided into separate compartments for each embryo. Newly ovulated egg cases measure 3.9 cm (1.5 in) by 2.6 cm (1.0 in); after hatching the embryos are sustained by a yolk sac during the first stage of development. After two months, the embryo measures 4 cm (1.6 in) long and has well-developed external gills. After four months, the yolk sac has begun to be converted into a placental connection that attaches to the uterine wall; at this time, the embryo's dark fin markings develop. By five months, the embryo measures 24 cm (9.4 in) and has resorbed its external gills; the placenta is fully formed, though some yolk remains until seven months into gestation.

Parturition occurs from September to November, with females making use of shallow nursery areas interior of the reef. Newborn pups measure 40–50 cm (16–20 in) long in the Indian Ocean and off northern Australia, while free-swimming pups as small as 33 cm (13 in) long have been observed in the Pacific islands. The litter size is 2–5 (typically 4), and is not correlated with female size. Young blacktip reef sharks commonly form large groups in water barely deep enough to cover their bodies, over sand flats or in mangrove swamps close to shore. During high tide, they also move onto flooded coral platforms or seaweed beds. Growth is initially rapid; one documented captive shark grew an average of 23 cm (9.1 in) per year in its first two years of life. The growth rate slows to around 5 cm (2.0 in) per year in juveniles and adults. Males and females mature sexually at lengths of 95 cm (37 in) and 97 cm (38 in) respectively off northern Australia, and 105 cm (41 in) and 110 cm (43 in), respectively, off Aldabra. Males mature at 97 cm (38 in) long off Palmyra Atoll.

== Human interactions ==
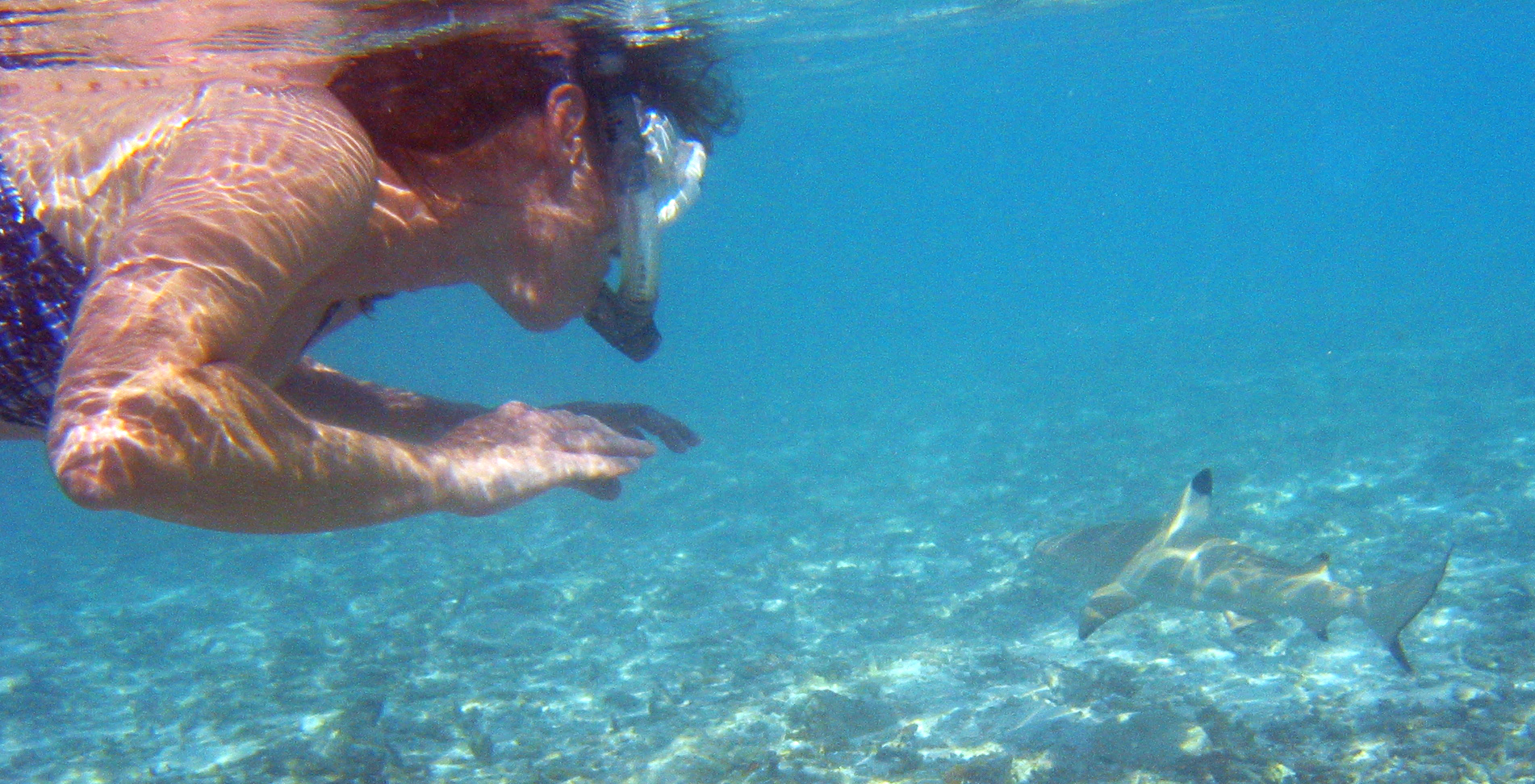
Submerged swimmers are less likely to be bitten by the blacktip reef shark than waders.

Under most circumstances, the blacktip reef shark has a timid demeanor and is easily frightened away by swimmers. However, its inshore habitat preferences bring it into frequent contact with humans, and thus it is regarded as potentially dangerous. As of late 2025 there are 14 unprovoked attacks and around 35-42 in total were listed on the International Shark Attack File that are attributable to the blacktip reef shark. Most attacks involve sharks biting the legs or feet of waders, apparently mistaking them for their natural prey, and do not result in serious injury. In the Marshall Islands, native islanders avoid blacktip reef shark attacks by swimming rather than wading through shallow water, as a way of discouraging these sharks is to submerge one's body. The blacktip reef shark has also been known to become aggressive in the presence of bait, and may pose a threat while attempting to steal the catches of spear fishers.

The blacktip reef shark is a normal catch of coastal fisheries, such as those operating off Thailand and India, but is not targeted or considered commercially important. The meat (sold fresh, frozen, dried and salted, or smoked for human consumption), liver oil, and fins are used. The International Union for Conservation of Nature has assessed the blacktip reef shark as Vulnerable and declining. Though it remains widespread and common overall, substantial local declines due to overfishing have now been documented in many areas. This species has a low reproductive rate, limiting its capacity for recovering from depletion. Blacktip reef sharks are popular subjects of public aquarium exhibits, because of their stereotypically "shark-like" appearance, ability to breed in captivity and modest size, and are also attractions for ecotourism divers.

== See also ==
- Oceanic whitetip shark and Whitetip reef shark – another species of requiem sharks known for and named after the coloration of the tips of its fins
