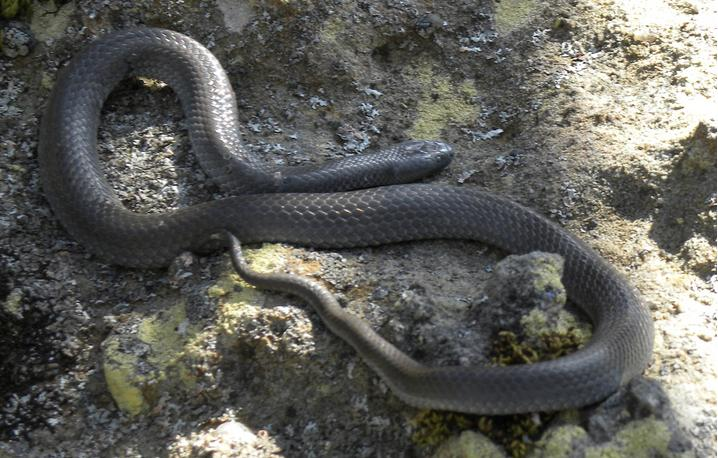
- Cryptophis nigrescens

Scientific classification
- Kingdom: Animalia
- Phylum: Chordata
- Class: Reptilia
- Order: Squamata
- Suborder: Serpentes
- Family: Elapidae
- Subfamily: Hydrophiinae
- Genus: Cryptophis; Worrell, 1961

= Cryptophis =

Genus of snakes

Cryptophis is a genus of venomous snakes in the family Elapidae. The genus is native to Australia and New Guinea.

== Species ==
The following five species are recognized as being valid.

- Cryptophis boschmai (Brongersma & Knaap-van Meeuven, 1964) - Carpentaria whip snake
- Cryptophis incredibilis (Wells & Wellington, 1985) - pink snake
- Cryptophis nigrescens (Günther, 1862) - small-eyed snake, eastern small-eyed snake, short-tailed snake
- Cryptophis nigrostriatus (Krefft, 1864) - black-striped snake
- Cryptophis pallidiceps (Günther, 1858) - western Carpentaria snake, northern small-eyed snake

Nota bene: A binomial authority in parentheses indicates that the species was originally described in a genus other than Cryptophis.

== Etymology ==
The generic name is a combination of the Greek words κρυπτός (concealed, hidden, secret) and ὄφις (snake).
