= Incongruelaps =

Scientific classification
- Domain: Eukaryota
- Kingdom: Animalia
- Phylum: Chordata
- Class: Reptilia
- Order: Squamata
- Suborder: Serpentes
- Family: Elapidae
- Genus: †Incongruelaps; Scanlon et al., 2003
- Species: †I. iteratus

Binomial name
- †Incongruelaps iteratus Scanlon et al., 2003

Extinct genus of reptiles

Incongruelaps is an extinct genus of elapid snake from the Encore site of Riversleigh World Heritage Fossil Property in Australia. The holotype (QM F42691) is a Late Miocene approximately 10 million years old, mid trunk vertebrae. Other disarticulated vertebrae, right maxilla and a fragment of the left dentary are presumed to be a single individual based on size comparisons; a chance accumulation of fragment of different unassociated individuals can not be ruled out.
