= Grey's mudsnake =

Conservation status
- Least Concern (IUCN 3.1)

Scientific classification
- Kingdom: Animalia
- Phylum: Chordata
- Class: Reptilia
- Order: Squamata
- Suborder: Serpentes
- Family: Elapidae
- Genus: Ephalophis; M.A. Smith, 1931
- Species: E. greyae

Binomial name
- Ephalophis greyae M.A. Smith, 1931

Synonyms
- Ephalophis greyi M.A. Smith, 1931; Ephalophis greyae — Shea, 1996; Ephalophis greyae — Wallach et al., 2014

Species of snake

Grey's mudsnake (Ephalophis greyae), also known commonly as Grey's sea snake, the mangrove seasnake, and the north-western mangrove sea snake, is a species of venomous snake in the subfamily Hydrophiinae of the family Elapidae. The species is endemic to northwestern Australia.

== Etymology ==
Its specific name, greyae, has also been spelled greyi; however, it was named after a Beatrice Grey who collected the holotype, necessitating a feminine possessive.

== Geographic range ==
E. greyae is found along the northwestern coast of the Australian state of Western Australia, from Shark Bay to Kimberley Region.

== Habitat ==
The preferred natural habitats of E. greyae are mud flats, salt flats, the marine intertidal zone, and the marine neritic zone, to a depth of 10 m (33 ft).

== Description ==
A small species of sea snake, E. greyae may attain a total length (including tail) of 66 cm (26 in).

== Diet ==
E. greyae preys upon fishes, especially gobies and their eggs.

== Reproduction ==
E. greyae is viviparous.
