= Antaioserpens =

Scientific classification
- Kingdom: Animalia
- Phylum: Chordata
- Class: Reptilia
- Order: Squamata
- Suborder: Serpentes
- Family: Elapidae
- Subfamily: Hydrophiinae
- Genus: Antaioserpens; Wells & Wellington, 1985

Genus of snakes

Antaioserpens is a genus of mildly venomous snakes of the family Elapidae.

== Species ==
- Antaioserpens albiceps (Boulenger, 1898) – northeastern plain-nosed burrowing snake, robust burrowing snake
- Antaioserpens warro (De Vis, 1884) – Warrego burrowing snake
