= Drysdalia =

Scientific classification
- Kingdom: Animalia
- Phylum: Chordata
- Class: Reptilia
- Order: Squamata
- Suborder: Serpentes
- Family: Elapidae
- Subfamily: Hydrophiinae
- Genus: Drysdalia; Worrell, 1961

Genus of snakes

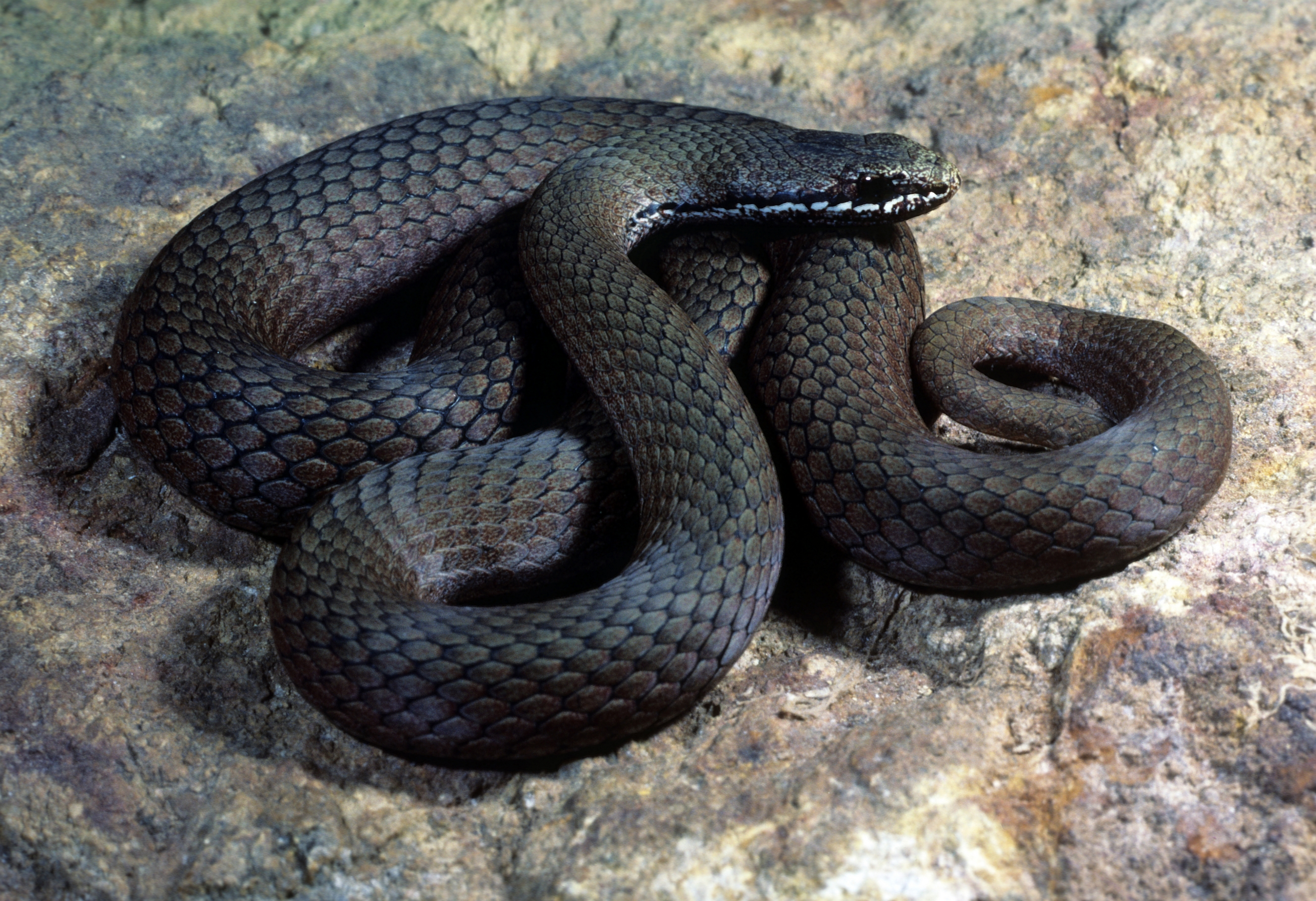
Drysdalia coronoides – white-lipped snake

Drysdalia is a genus of snakes, commonly known as crowned snakes, belonging to the family Elapidae. The three species in this genus are venomous snakes, but not considered deadly.

== Geographic range ==
Species of the genus Drysdalia are endemic to parts of southern and eastern Australia.

== Species ==
Three species are recognized as being valid.

- Drysdalia coronoides (Günther, 1858) – white-lipped snake
- Drysdalia mastersii (Krefft, 1866) – Masters's snake
- Drysdalia rhodogaster (Jan & Sordelli, 1873) – mustard-bellied snake

== Etymology ==
The generic name, Drysdalia, is in honour of Australian artist George Russell Drysdale.

== Taxonomy ==
The species formerly known as Drysdalia coronata (Schlegel, 1837), commonly known as the crowned snake, was assigned to the genus Elapognathus Boulenger, 1896, by Keogh et al. in 2000. Its current correct scientific name is Elapognathus coronatus (Schlegel, 1837).

== Description ==
Crowned snakes are small snakes, averaging about 50 cm (20 inches) in total length (including tail) but can be as small as 18 cm (7 inches). They are normally brown in colour.

== Habitat ==
Crowned snakes inhabit woodlands, swamps, and heathland.

== Diet ==
Drysdalia feed on frogs and lizards.
