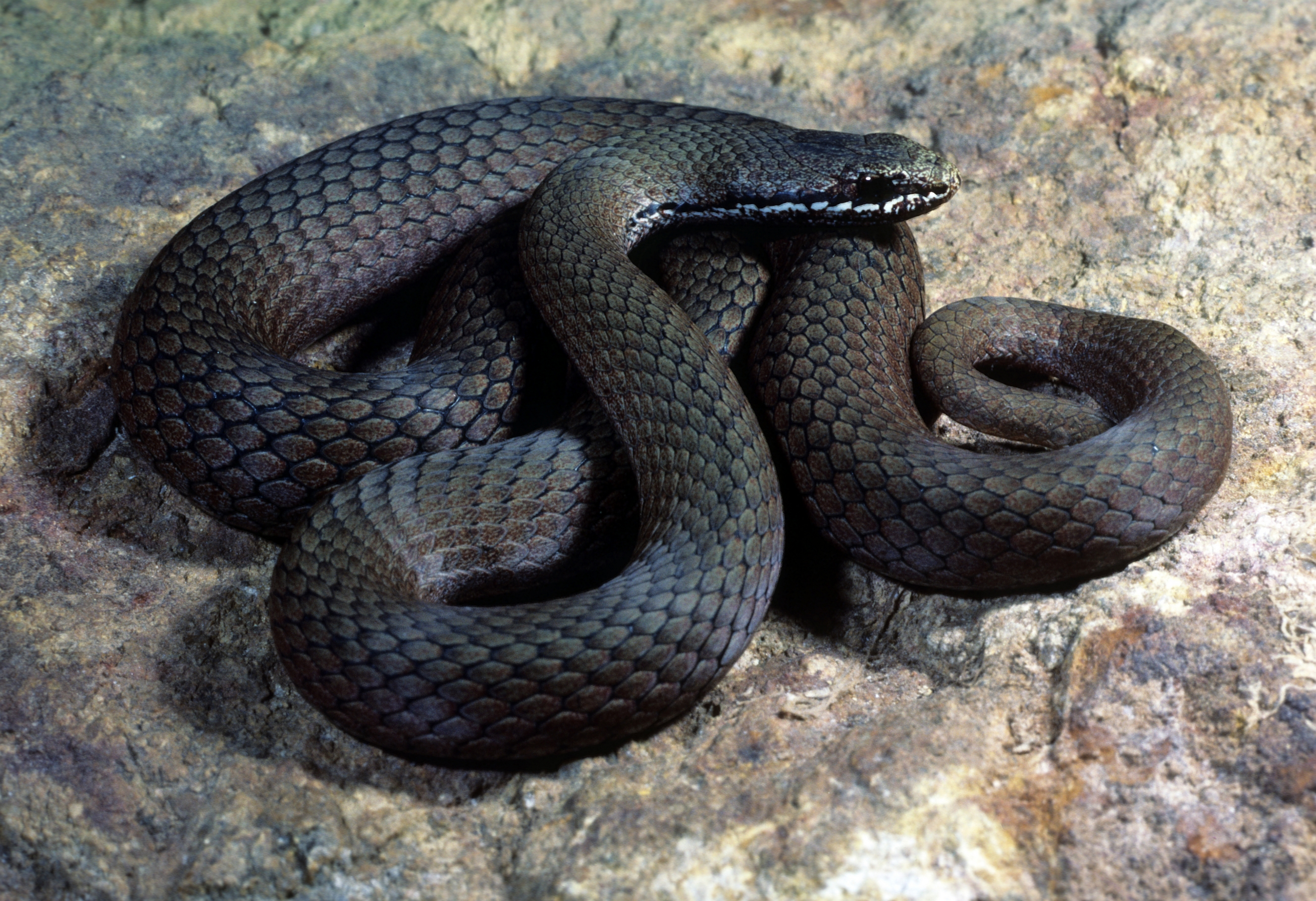

Conservation status
- Least Concern (IUCN 3.1)

Scientific classification
- Kingdom: Animalia
- Phylum: Chordata
- Class: Reptilia
- Order: Squamata
- Suborder: Serpentes
- Family: Elapidae
- Genus: Drysdalia
- Species: D. coronoides

Binomial name
- Drysdalia coronoides (Günther, 1858)

Synonyms
- Hoplocephalus coronoides Günther, 1858; Alecto labialis Jan & Sordelli, 1873; Denisonia coronoides — Boulenger, 1896; Denisonia nigra De Vis, 1905; Denisonia coronoides — Kinghorn, 1924; Drysdalia coronoides — Worrell, 1961; Notechis coronoides — Storr, 1982; Drysdalia coronoides — Cogger, 1983

= White-lipped snake =

Species of snake

The white-lipped snake (Drysdalia coronoides) is a small species of venomous snake in the family Elapidae. The species is endemic to south-eastern mainland Australia and Tasmania.

== Description ==
D. coronoides is the smallest of three species of snake found in Tasmania, and is Australia's most cold-tolerant snake, even inhabiting areas on Mount Kosciuszko above the snow line. Growing to only about 40 cm (16 in) in length (including tail), it feeds almost exclusively on skinks.

It belongs to the genus Drysdalia, and is often referred to as the whip snake in Tasmania (whip snake in mainland Australia usually refers to snakes from the genus Demansia which are only found on the mainland). The species gets its common name from a thin, white line that runs along the upper lip, bordered above by a narrow black line. D. coronoides is viviparous.
