= Northern mangrove seasnake =

Conservation status
- Data Deficient (IUCN 3.1)

Scientific classification
- Kingdom: Animalia
- Phylum: Chordata
- Class: Reptilia
- Order: Squamata
- Suborder: Serpentes
- Family: Elapidae
- Genus: Parahydrophis
- Species: P. mertoni

Binomial name
- Parahydrophis mertoni (Roux, 1910)

Synonyms
- Distira mertoni Roux, 1910; Hydrophis mertoni — de Rooij, 1917; Parahydrophis mertoni — Burger & Natsuno, 1974

Species of snake

The northern mangrove seasnake (Parahydrophis mertoni), also known commonly as the Arafura smooth seasnake and Merton's sea snake, is a species of venomous snake in the family Elapidae. The species is native to Australia and New Guinea.

== Taxonomy ==
The species was first described in 1910 as Distira mertoni by Jean Roux. It was transferred to the genus, Parahydrophis, in 1974 by Burger and Natsuno.

== Etymology ==
The specific name, mertoni, is in honor of German zoologist Hugo Merton.

== Geographic range ==
Parahydrophis mertoni is found in Northern Australia in Northern Territory and Queensland. It is also found in New Guinea in the Arafura Sea. It is found in the inter-tidal zone.

== Description ==
Parahydrophis mertoni is blackish-olive with about 46 yellow rings on the body and ten on the tail. The head shields are spotted with yellow, except for the rostral and labials which are black.

The holotype, which Roux called junge (young), has a total length (tail included) of 38 cm (15 in). According to Wilson and Swan 2023, adults usually have a total length of about 50 cm (20 in).

== Reproduction ==
Parahydrophis mertoni is viviparous.
