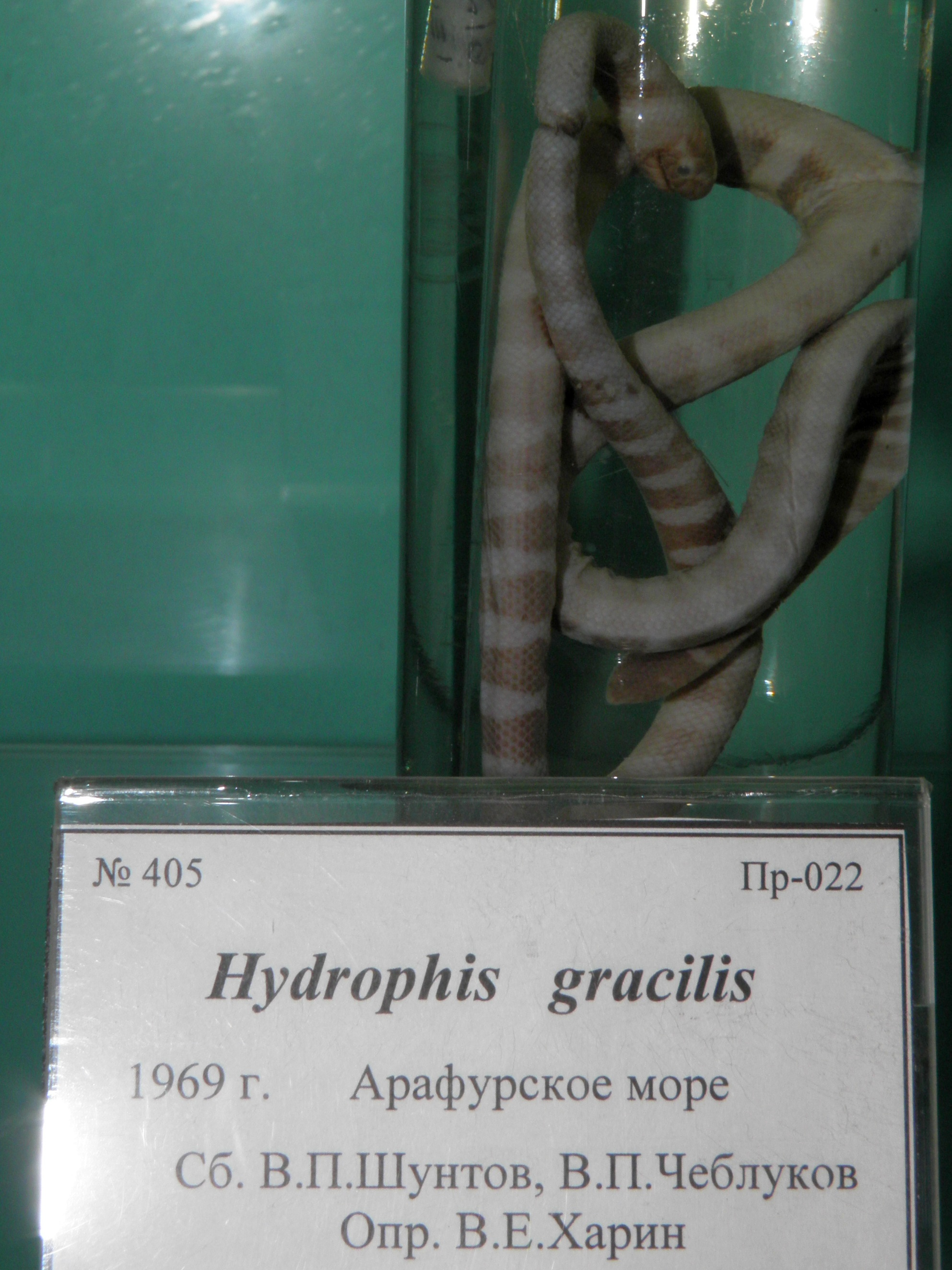

Conservation status
- Least Concern (IUCN 3.1)

Scientific classification
- Kingdom: Animalia
- Phylum: Chordata
- Class: Reptilia
- Order: Squamata
- Suborder: Serpentes
- Family: Elapidae
- Genus: Microcephalophis; Lesson, 1832
- Species: M. gracilis

Binomial name
- Microcephalophis gracilis (Shaw, 1802)

Synonyms
- Hydrophis gracilis

= Microcephalophis =

Species of snake

Microcephalophis gracilis, also known as the graceful small-headed seasnake, slender sea snake, narrow-headed sea snake, common small-headed sea snake, is a species of sea snake found in the Indian and Pacific Oceans. It is venomous. It eats eels.

== Diagnostic characters ==
Head small, body long and slender anteriorly; scales on thickest part of body juxtaposed; 5–6 maxillary teeth behind fangs; 17–21 scale rows around neck, 30–36 around thickest part of body (increase from neck to midbody 18–24); ventrals divided by a longitudinal fissure; prefrontal in contact with third upper labial; ventrals 220–287.

Total length males 950 mm, females 1025 mm; tail length males 80 mm, females 95 mm.

== Distribution ==
Microcephalophis gracilis is found on the coasts of the Indian Ocean and West Pacific, from around the Persian Gulf (Bahrain, Qatar, Saudi Arabia, Oman, United Arab Emirates (UAE), Iran, Iraq and Kuwait) to Pakistan, India, Sri Lanka, Bangladesh, Myanmar, Thailand, and Indonesia, and into the Malay Archipelago/West Pacific in Thailand, Malaysia, Singapore, Cambodia, Vietnam, the Philippines, southern China, Hong Kong, and Taiwan, as well as in Australia (Queensland) and Papua New Guinea.

== Venom Characteristics ==
The venom of this species is dangerous and can be fatal. The symptoms generally began to appear within 30 minutes after being bitten. The bite typically does not cause any pain. Muscles get affected once the venom starts to act causing paralysis which is one of the major characteristics of its bite. Victim may also experience headache, thirst and sweating after the bite.
