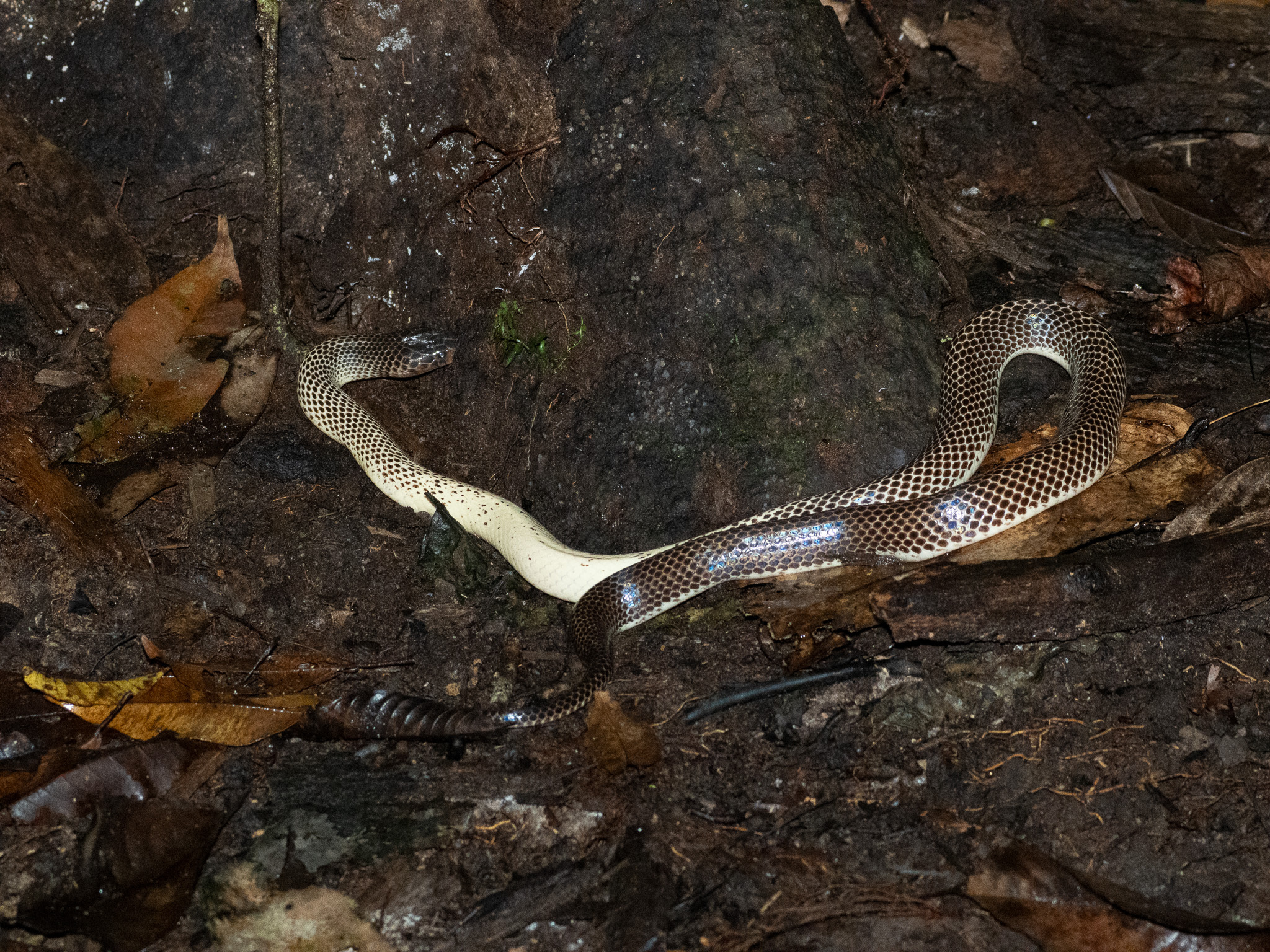

Scientific classification
- Kingdom: Animalia
- Phylum: Chordata
- Class: Reptilia
- Order: Squamata
- Suborder: Serpentes
- Family: Elapidae
- Genus: Micropechis; Boulenger, 1896
- Species: M. ikaheca

Binomial name
- Micropechis ikaheca (Lesson, 1829)

Synonyms
- Micropechis ikaheka

= Micropechis =

Species of snake

Micropechis ikaheca, commonly known as the New Guinea small-eyed snake or Ikaheka snake, is a highly venomous elapid, the only species in the genus Micropechis. The holotype was collected at Doré (modern day Manokwari) on the Vogelkop of Netherlands New Guinea, and described in 1829, by the naturalist on board the French Navy vessel La Coquille, ship's surgeon René Primevère Lesson, in a volume of the three-year circumnavigation (1922-1925) by Louis Isidore Duperrey, captain of La Coquille. Lesson's holotype is housed in the collection of the Muséum National d'Histoire Naturelle, in Paris, with the museum accession no. MNHN 7669.

== Names ==
It is known as sataw in the Kalam language of Papua New Guinea.

== Distribution ==
Micropechis ikaheca is endemic to New Guinea and adjacent islands, notably Karkar Island, Madang Province, in Papua New Guinea, where it is particularly common and referred to as the "white snake" due to its pale coloring. It is also found on neighboring Manam Island, and Walis Island in East Sepik Province, Papua New Guinea. In Indonesia, other than Western New Guinea, they can also be found on the Biak Islands, Raja Ampat Islands, and Aru Islands.

== Taxonomy ==
Two subspecies have been proposed. The nominate form, M. ikaheca ikaheca as described by Lesson, and which occurs on the Vogelkop, and the islands of Misool and Salawati in the Raja Ampat Archipelago, has very little banding on its pale yellow to brown body. M. ikaheca fasciatus, the banded form, described by German herpetologist and ichthyologist, Johann Gustav Fischer in 1884, is found throughout the rest of New Guinea. Specimens from southern Western New Guinea are strongly banded throughout, but most of the specimens from the remainder of New Guinea, including the Biak Islands, lack banding on the anterior section of the body. Specimens of M. ikaheca from Waigeo and Batanta, in the Raja Ampat Islands, are virtually black, without any patterning.

== Natural history ==
M. ikaheca is a thick-bodied, smooth-scaled snake that grows up to 2.1 metres (6.9 ft) long. It has small eyes that are typical of other semi-fossorial burrowing snakes, and is either nocturnal or crepuscular. In common with most other elapids, M. ikaheca is oviparous.

The name ikaheca means "land eel" in a local West Papuan dialect, indicating the snake's preference for damp or semi-aquatic habitats, such as swamps, creeks, wetlands, low-lying rainforest, and piles of discarded vegetation debris, i.e. oil palm windrows, and coconut palm husk piles. It may be encountered crossing roads following rain at night M. ikaheka hunts small vertebrates, including small rodents and bandicoots, ground-dwelling lizards such as skinks, and snakes, such as the New Guinea ground boa Candoia aspera. It is also cannibalistic.

== Venom ==
M. ikaheca is considered a dangerous species, having been implicated in numerous fatal bites on humans. The first proven human fatality occurred in 1958 in Wau, Papua New Guinea, where a young man died 36 hours after being bitten on the base of the thumb while handling the snake. Another envenomation occurred when a villager reportedly killed a specimen, but was then bitten on the left thumb by the "dead" snake when showing it to his neighbors (this bite may be due to postmortem reflex action). The species has since been firmly established as a medically important species. Bites typically occur when plantation workers are moving coconut palm husk piles, where the snakes shelter during the day, cutting grass, walking on plantation tracks, or harvesting cocoa beans. Although normally shy, if disturbed (e.g., handled, stepped on) it may become highly aggressive, striking readily and rapidly. Bites are tenacious and chewing, and are not easily released.

M. ikaheca is responsible for approximately 40% of all snake envenomations on Karkar Island, but less than 10% on the mainland, where the majority of snakebites are caused by the death adders. Symptoms typically include local muscle pain and tenderness, fever, abdominal pain, vomiting, dizziness, headache, hypotension, and spontaneous bleeding; severe envenomation may present neurotoxic and myotoxic symptoms such as ptosis, dysarthria, and trismus. Death may occur from respiratory paralysis. Although there is no specific antivenom therapy for M. ikaheka bites, CSL polyvalent antivenom has been found to be beneficial.

== See also ==
- Venomous snake
- List of snakes
