= Parapistocalamus =

Conservation status
- Data Deficient (IUCN 3.1)

Scientific classification
- Kingdom: Animalia
- Phylum: Chordata
- Class: Reptilia
- Order: Squamata
- Suborder: Serpentes
- Family: Elapidae
- Genus: Parapistocalamus; Roux, 1934
- Species: P. hedigeri

Binomial name
- Parapistocalamus hedigeri Roux, 1934

Genus of snakes

Parapistocalamus is a genus of venomous snake in the family Elapidae.

== Species ==
The genus Parapistocalamus contains the sole species Parapistocalamus hedigeri, commonly known as Hediger's coral snake.

== Etymology ==
The specific name, hedigeri, is in honor of Swiss biologist Heini Hediger.

== Geographic range ==
P. hedigeri is found in Papua New Guinea.

== Description ==
P. hedigeri is a small slender snake. The average total length (including tail) is 30 centimetres (12 in), and the maximum recorded total length is 50 centimetres (20 in). The head is only slightly wider than the neck. The eye is small, and the pupil is round. The smooth dorsal scales are arranged in 15 rows at midbody. Dorsally, it is uniform brown, and ventrally it is yellowish. It may have a lighter collar.

== Habitat ==
The preferred habitat of P. hedigeri is forest.

== Behavior ==
P. hedigeri is crepuscular or nocturnal. It burrows in leaf litter and rotten logs.

== Reproduction ==
P. hedigeri is probably oviparous.
