= Loveridgelaps =

Conservation status
- Vulnerable (IUCN 3.1)

Scientific classification
- Kingdom: Animalia
- Phylum: Chordata
- Class: Reptilia
- Order: Squamata
- Suborder: Serpentes
- Family: Elapidae
- Genus: Loveridgelaps; McDowell, 1970
- Species: L. elapoides

Binomial name
- Loveridgelaps elapoides (Boulenger, 1890)
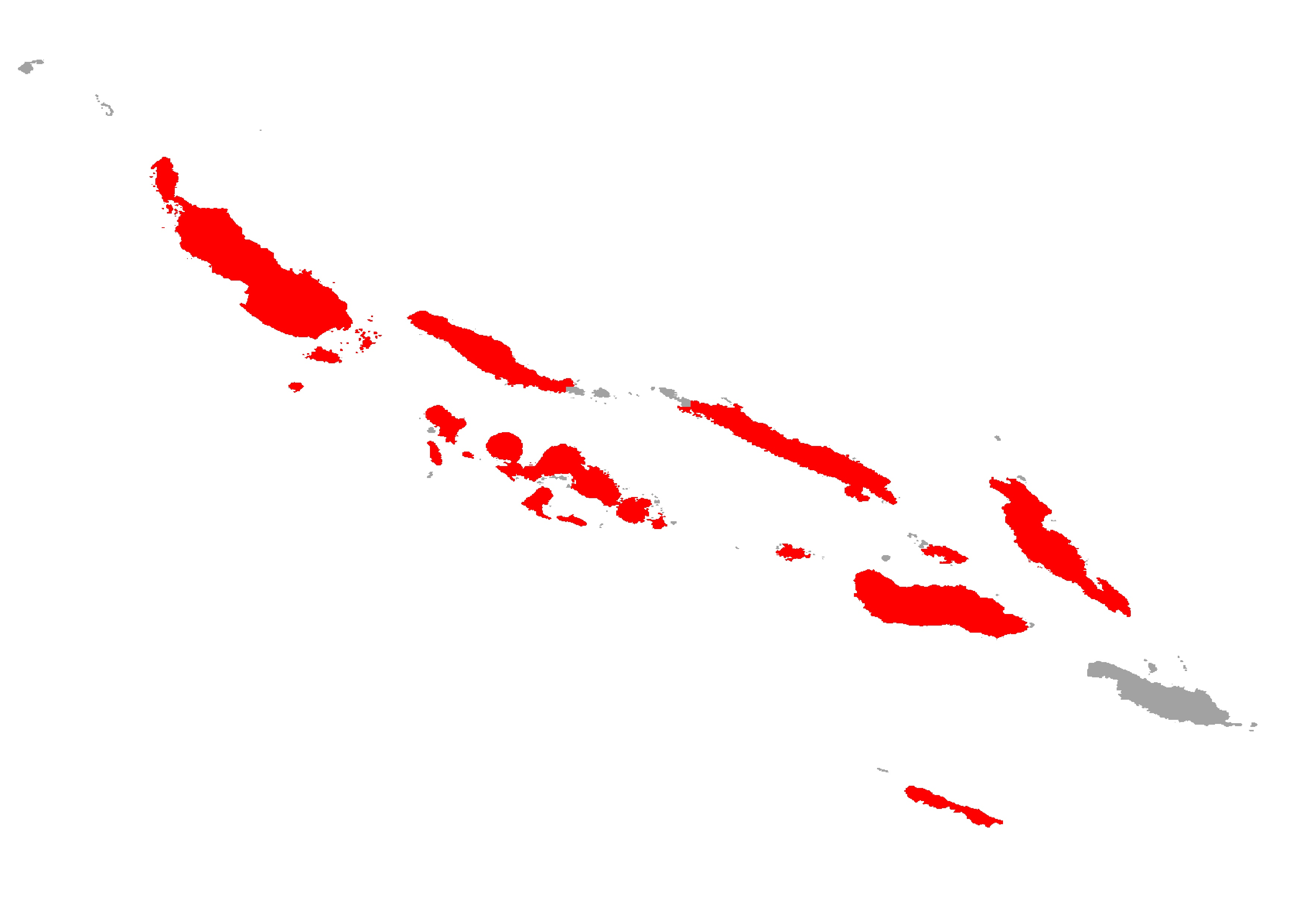

Genus of snakes

Loveridgelaps is a genus of snake in the family Elapidae. It contains a single species, Loveridgelaps elapoides, commonly known as the Solomons small-eyed snake.

It is found in the Solomon Islands archipelago.
