= Salomonelaps =

Conservation status
- Least Concern (IUCN 3.1)

Scientific classification
- Kingdom: Animalia
- Phylum: Chordata
- Class: Reptilia
- Order: Squamata
- Suborder: Serpentes
- Family: Elapidae
- Genus: Salomonelaps; McDowell, 1970
- Species: S. par

Binomial name
- Salomonelaps par (Boulenger, 1884)

Genus of snakes

Salomonelaps (commonly known as Solomons coral snake) is a genus of snake in the family Elapidae that contains the sole species Salomonelaps par.

It is found in the Solomon Islands.
