= Fiji snake =

Conservation status
- Endangered (IUCN 3.1)

Scientific classification
- Kingdom: Animalia
- Phylum: Chordata
- Class: Reptilia
- Order: Squamata
- Suborder: Serpentes
- Family: Elapidae
- Genus: Ogmodon; W. Peters, 1864
- Species: O. vitianus

Binomial name
- Ogmodon vitianus W. Peters, 1864
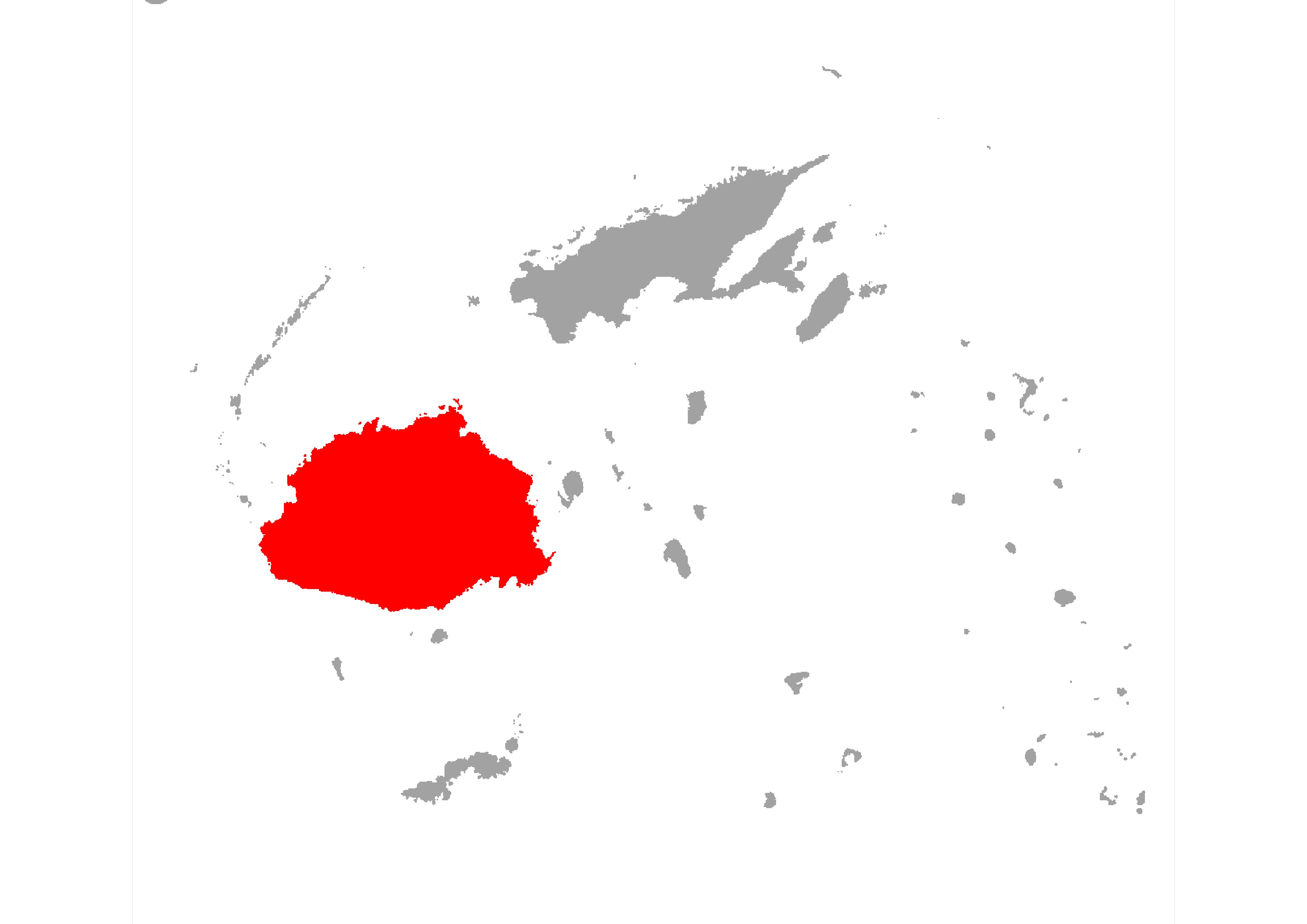

Species of snake

The Fiji snake (Ogmodon vitianus), also known as the Bolo snake, is a species of snake in the family Elapidae. It is monotypic within the genus Ogmodon. It is endemic to Fiji, found only on the island of Viti Levu, and is strongly subterranean.

== SOURCES ==
- Fijian Burrowing Snake (bolo), Ogmodon vitianus.
- "Fiji tropical dry forests". Terrestrial Ecoregions. World Wildlife Fund.
