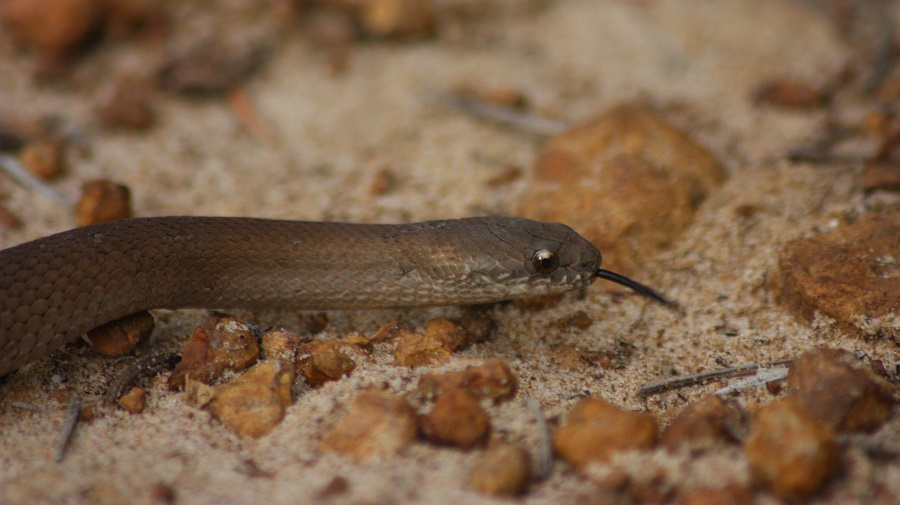

Conservation status
- Least Concern (IUCN 3.1)

Scientific classification
- Kingdom: Animalia
- Phylum: Chordata
- Class: Reptilia
- Order: Squamata
- Suborder: Serpentes
- Family: Elapidae
- Genus: Echiopsis; Fitzinger, 1843
- Species: E. curta

Binomial name
- Echiopsis curta (Schlegel, 1843)

= Echiopsis =

Bardick

Genus of snakes

Echiopsis curta is a terrestrial, elapid species of snake, also commonly known from the Aboriginal name as the bardick. It is a short, highly venomous snake with variable color which is mainly nocturnal, reaching a maximum length of 57 cm (22 in). It is endemic to Australia, most commonly found in three distinct populations through southern Australia. They are considered venomous to humans, however there is very little information. Their population is decreasing due to habitat degradation and destruction but considered least concern on the IUCN Red List.

== Description ==
The bardick grows up to maximum of 57 cm (22 in) in length with a thick set stumpy body with a short tail. Its smooth scales vary in color from pale to dark grey, brown and reddish, darker along the head and back, this lightens along the sides, with white to cream belly. Lips are spotted with white. The bardick has short hollow fixed fangs which is uses to deliver toxic venom to its prey.

== Distribution and habitat ==
Echiopsis curta has three distinct populations in semi-arid areas in the south of Australia, south-west Western Australia, the Eyre peninsula of South Australia and another in western Victoria and New South Wales.

It inhabits heath, scrubland and open forest in the west and favors mallee and Triodia grassland country in the eastern population. They like to live under leaf litter, fallen trees and debris. The major threat to bardick numbers is due to loss of habitat from clearing.

== Diet ==
It is an ambush style predator which is mostly nocturnal in habit and a diet consisting of mainly lizards (52%), frogs (31%) and mammals (13%), plus some birds and insects. Eastern populations eat fewer amphibians than western populations. Studies conducted on diet showed prey types contained multiple species of each type.

== Lifespan and reproduction ==
Bardicks are ovoviviparous, with litters ranging between 3 and 14 and averaging 7 young. These are born up to 15 cm (5.9 in) in length. Mating occurs in late spring, gestation over summer and birthing in late summer and autumn. Males reach sexual maturity at 29 cm (11 in) snout-vent length (SVL) at between 17 and 19 months of age. Females reach reproductive age at 28 cm (11 in) SVL at approximately 32 months of age. Body size is strongly correlated to reproductive fitness. This species shows one of the largest litter volumes, a single specimen at 41 cm (16 in) SVL had 13 full size embryos extending 34 cm (13 in) internally, to 7 cm (2.8 in) from the snout.

== Venom ==
Research into venom of E. curta is extremely limited. There is some suggestion of similarities to the common death adder (Acanthophis antarcticus), due to a snake venom detection kit false positive on a dog, outside the geographical range of that species. Bites on humans are rare, with one case requiring hospitalization due to complications which were abated with the administration of common death adder antivenom.

Venom has been shown to include neurotoxins and is highly neurotoxic to avian tissues, comparable to tiger snake, copperhead and inland taipan. However, it has not shown neurotoxic effects even though significant envenoming has occurred.
