= Hydrelaps =

Conservation status
- Least Concern (IUCN 3.1)

Scientific classification
- Kingdom: Animalia
- Phylum: Chordata
- Class: Reptilia
- Order: Squamata
- Suborder: Serpentes
- Family: Elapidae
- Genus: Hydrelaps; Boulenger, 1896
- Species: H. darwiniensis

Binomial name
- Hydrelaps darwiniensis Boulenger, 1896

Genus of snakes

Hydrelaps is a monotypic genus of venomous sea snake in the family Elapidae. The genus contains the sole species Hydrelaps darwiniensis, also commonly known as the black-ringed mangrove snake, the black-ringed sea snake, Darwin's sea snake, and the Port Darwin sea snake. The species is native to Australia and New Guinea.

== Etymology ==
The specific name, darwiniensis, refers to the city of Darwin, Northern Territory, Australia.

== Habitat ==
The preferred natural habitats of H. darwiniensis are mangrove mudflats and seawater to a depth of 10 m (33 ft).

== Reproduction ==
H. darwiniensis is viviparous.
