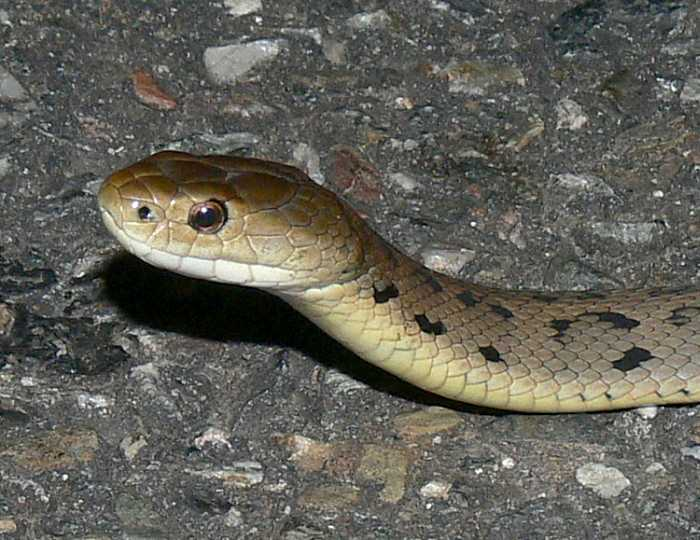

Scientific classification
- Kingdom: Animalia
- Phylum: Chordata
- Class: Reptilia
- Order: Squamata
- Suborder: Serpentes
- Family: Elapidae
- Genus: Tropidechis
- Species: T. carinatus

Binomial name
- Tropidechis carinatus (Krefft, 1863)

= Rough-scaled snake =

Species of snake

The rough-scaled snake (Tropidechis carinatus) is a highly venomous Australian elapid. The animal's name comes from its scales that are raised above the surrounding scales and have rough texture. The scales are known as "keels".

== Taxonomy ==
A 2016 genetic analysis showed that the closest relative of the rough-scaled snake is the tiger snake (Notechis spp.).

== Description ==
The snake is brown to olive with narrow, irregular cross-bands or blotches of darker brown. The belly surfaces are greenish-grey or olive-cream, often with darker blotches. The mid-body scales have a raised keel or carinated appearance. The coloration and scale structure has led to some confusion with the non venomous keelback snake. It grows to around 70 cm in length.

== Habitat ==
The snake's habitat includes rainforests, moist open air forests and waterways. It is found from mid-eastern New South Wales to the tip of far-north Queensland.

== Behaviour ==
The snake is active both day and night. It can climb trees in pursuit of prey. The rough-scaled snake is highly venomous and will readily bite if attacked or handled.

== Diet ==
The snake eats a variety of small vertebrates; frogs, lizards, small mammals, birds. It generally forages at ground level but can climb to take prey.

== Venom ==
The rough-scaled snake is a highly venomous snake. Its venom is a fast acting powerful neurotoxin that has potent post-synaptic neurotoxins as well as potent pre-synaptic neurotoxins. It also has potent coagulants as well as myotoxins. It will readily bite and is known for its foul disposition and defensive nature. Several fatalities have occurred due to this species and it will strike rapidly in defense.

== Reference list ==
- https://web.archive.org/web/20110608192952/http://www.kingsnake.com/toxinology/old/snakes/Tropidechis/Tropidechis.html
