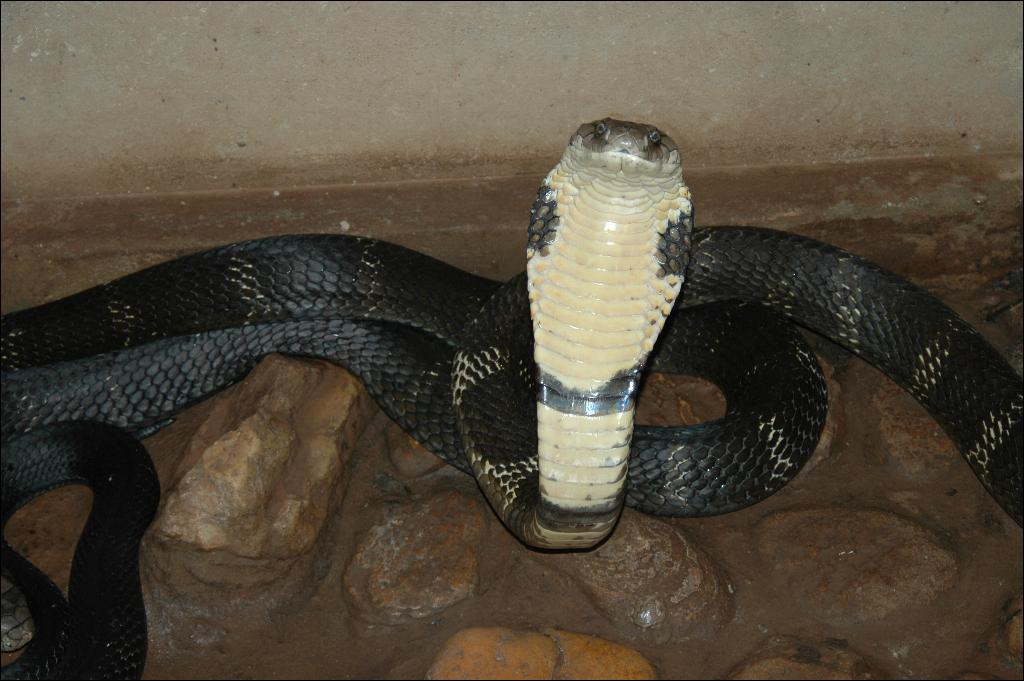
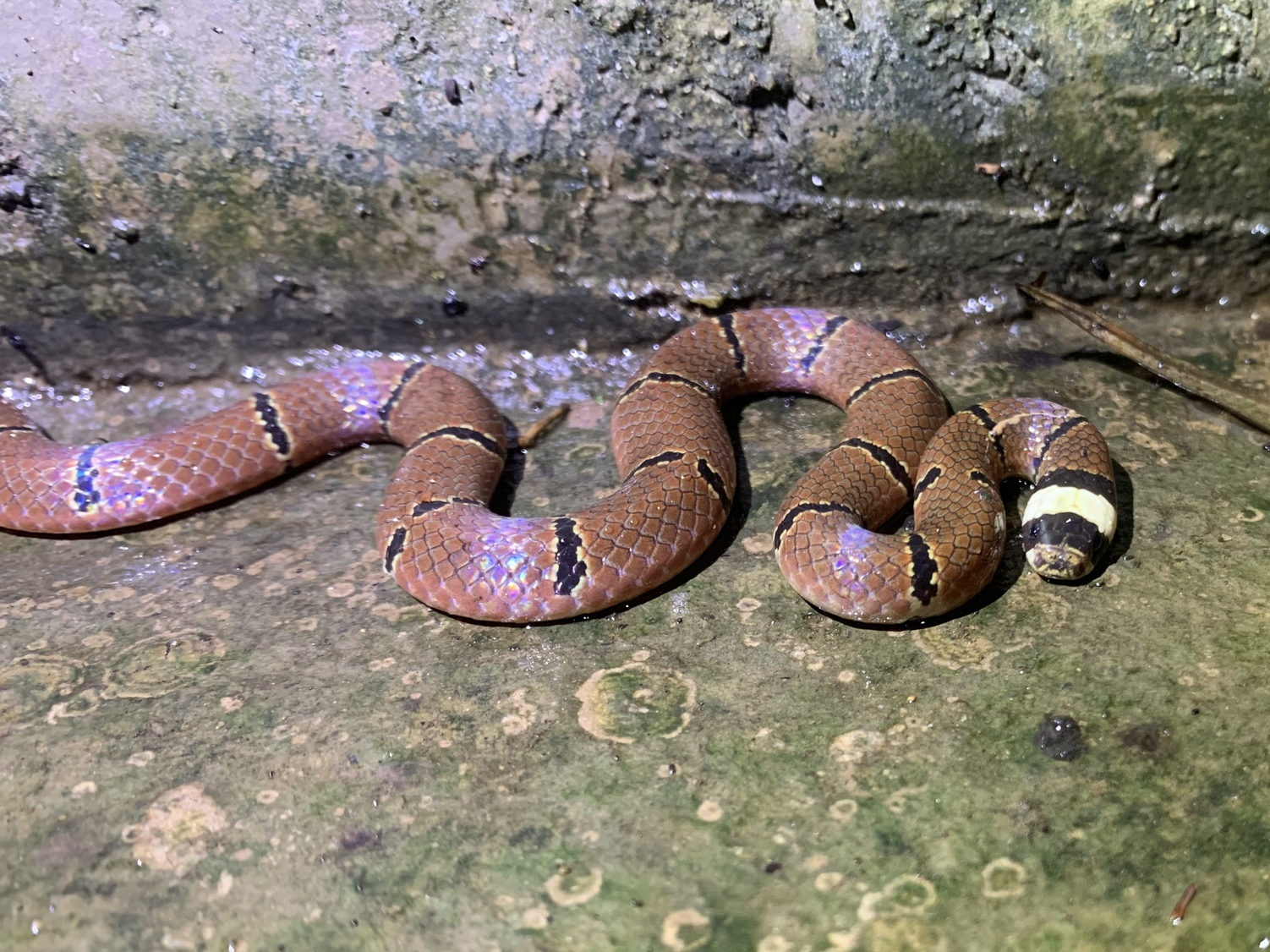
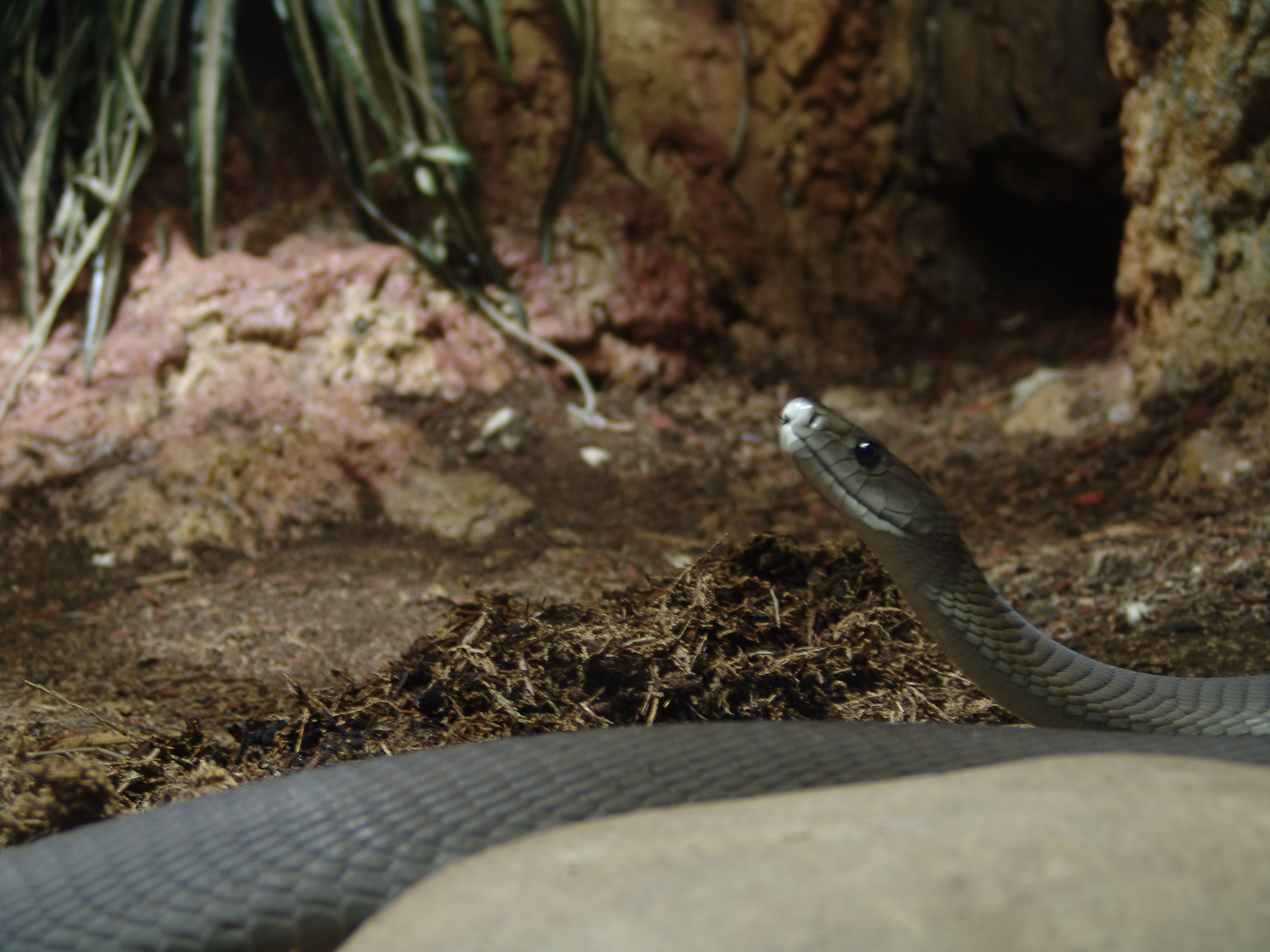
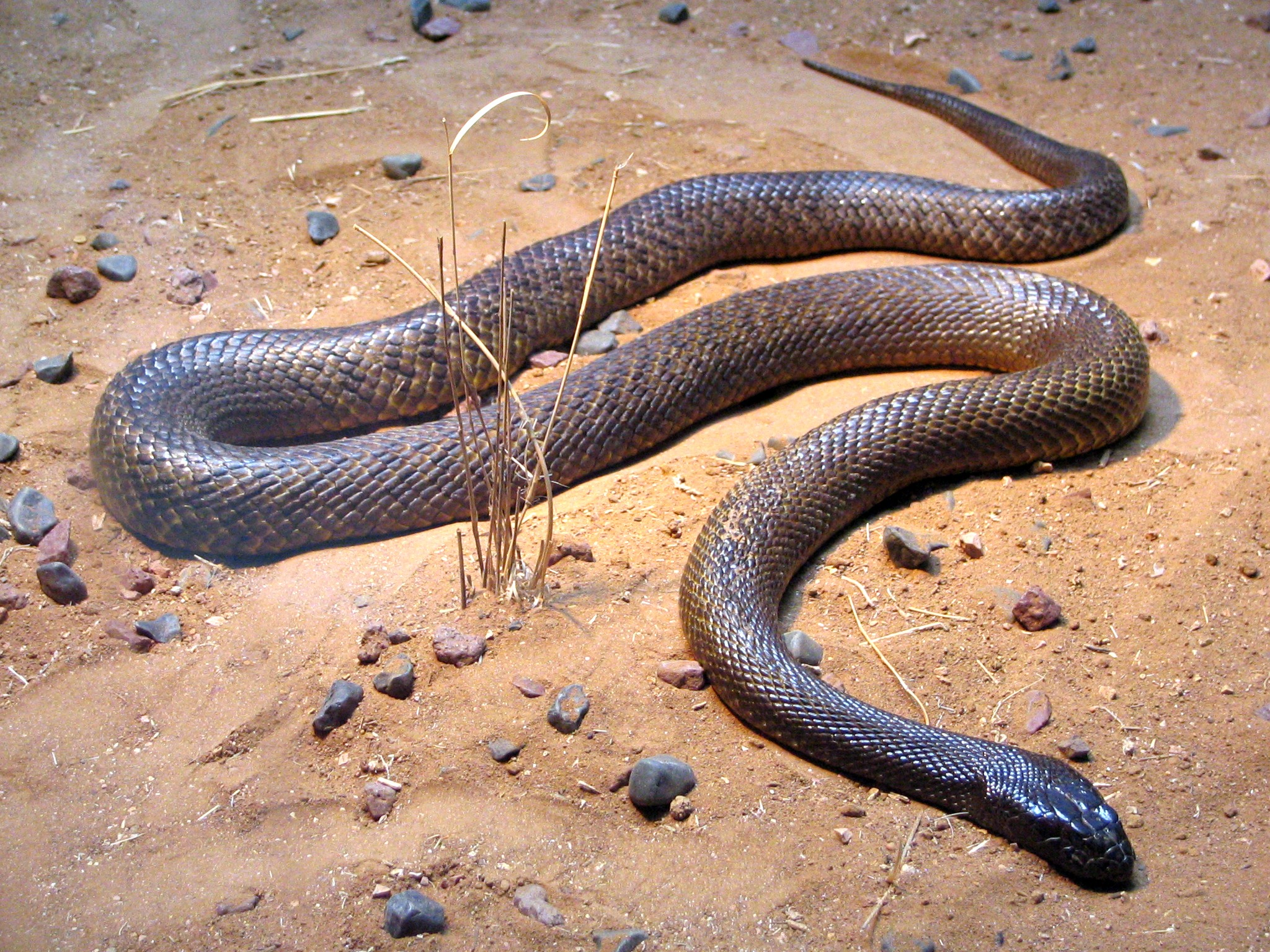
- From the top left clockwise: king cobra, oriental coral snake, inland taipan and black mamba

Scientific classification
- Kingdom: Animalia
- Phylum: Chordata
- Class: Reptilia
- Order: Squamata
- Suborder: Serpentes
- Superfamily: Elapoidea
- Family: Elapidae; F. Boie, 1827

Subfamilies and genera (Note: The elapids in the past were considered to have two subfamilies–the Elapinae made of terrestrial species and Hydrophiinae made of marine species. In 1997, Slowinski, Knight, and Rooney found in their phylogenetic analysis using amino acid sequences from venom proteins, that the Australasian terrestrial species nested within Hydrophiinae. This led to removing the Australasian terrestrial species and placing them in the Hydrophiinae. This has been support in subsequent recent genomic analyses, though these same studies also found the subfamily Elapinae to be paraphyletic in respect to the Hydrophiinae. These studies have found coral snakes, cobras and mambas, kraits, and African gartersnakes forming successive outgroups to Hydrophiinae. Since there are available clade names for these groups (with the exception of Elapsoidea), it is ideal to bring back the subfamilies Calliophiinae, Micrurinae, Najinae, and Bungarinae.)
- Calliophiinae; Micrurinae; Naja; Bungarus; Elapsoidea; Hydrophiinae
- Elapidae distribution

= Elapidae =

Family of venomous snakes

Elapidae (/əˈlæpədiː/, commonly known as elapids /ˈɛləpɪdz/, from Ancient Greek: ἔλαψ élaps, variant of ἔλλοψ éllops "sea-fish") is a family of snakes characterized by their permanently erect fangs at the front of the mouth. Most elapids are venomous, with the exception of the genus Emydocephalus. Many members of this family exhibit a threat display of rearing upwards while spreading out a neck flap. Elapids are endemic to tropical and subtropical regions around the world, with terrestrial forms in Asia, Australia, Africa, and the Americas and marine forms in the Pacific and Indian Oceans. Members of the family have a wide range of sizes, from the 18 cm (7.1 in) white-lipped snake to the 5.85 m (19 ft 2 in) king cobra. Most species have neurotoxic venom that is channeled by their hollow fangs, and some may contain other toxic components in varying proportions. The family includes 55 genera with around 360 species and over 170 subspecies.

== Description ==
Terrestrial elapids look similar to the Colubridae; almost all have long, slender bodies with smooth scales, a head covered with large shields (and not always distinct from the neck), and eyes with rounded pupils. Also like colubrids, their behavior is usually quite active and fast, with most of the females being oviparous (egg-layers). Exceptions to these generalizations occur; for example, death adders (Acanthophis) have commonalities with the Viperidae family, such as shorter, stout bodies, rough/keeled scales, broad heads, cat-like pupils and ovoviviparous (internal hatchings with live births). Furthermore, they can also be sluggish, ambush predators with partially fragmented head shields, similar to rattlesnakes or Gaboon vipers.

Sea snakes (the Hydrophiinae), sometimes considered to be a separate family, have adapted to a marine way of life in different ways and to various degrees. All have evolved paddle-like tails for swimming and the ability to excrete salt. Most also have laterally compressed bodies, their ventral scales are much reduced in size, their nostrils are located dorsally (no internasal scales), and they give birth to live young (viviparity). The reduction in ventral scaling has greatly diminished their terrestrial mobility, but aids in swimming.

Members of this family have a wide range of sizes. Drysdalia species are small serpents typically 50 cm (20 in) and down to 18 cm (7.1 in) in length. Cobras, mambas, and taipans are mid- to large sized snakes which can reach 2 m (6 ft 7 in) or above. The king cobra is the world's longest venomous snake with a maximum length of 5.85 m (19.2 ft) and an average mass of 6 kg (13 lb).

=== Dentition ===
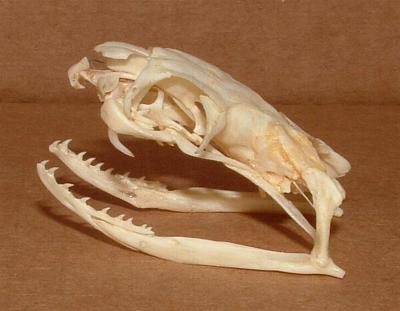
The lateral view of a king cobra's skull showing fangs

All elapids have a pair of proteroglyphous fangs to inject venom from glands located towards the rear of the upper jaw (except for the genus Emydocephalus, in which fangs are present as a vestigial feature but without venom production, as they have specialized toward a fish egg diet, making them the only non-venomous elapids). The fangs, which are enlarged and hollow, are the first two teeth on each maxillary bone. Usually only one fang is in place on each side at any time. The maxilla is intermediate in both length and mobility between typical colubrids (long, less mobile) and viperids (very short, highly mobile). When the mouth is closed, the fangs fit into grooved slots in the buccal floor and usually below the front edge of the eye and are angled backwards; some elapids (Acanthophis, taipan, mamba, and king cobra) have long fangs on quite mobile maxillae and can make fast strikes. A few species are capable of spraying their venom from forward-facing holes in their fangs for defense, as exemplified by spitting cobras.

== Behavior ==
Most elapids are terrestrial, while some are strongly arboreal (African Pseudohaje and Dendroaspis, Australian Hoplocephalus). Many species are more or less specialized burrowers (e.g. Ogmodon, Parapistocalamus, Simoselaps, Toxicocalamus, and Vermicella) in either humid or arid environments. Some species have very generalised diets (euryphagy), but many taxa have narrow prey preferences (stenophagy) and correlated morphological specializations, for example feeding almost exclusively on other serpents (especially the king cobra and kraits). Elapids may display a series of warning signs if provoked, either obviously or subtly. Cobras and mambas lift their inferior body parts, expand hoods, and hiss if threatened; kraits often curl up before hiding their heads down their bodies.

In general, sea snakes are able to respire through their skin. Experiments with the yellow-bellied sea snake, Hydrophis platurus, have shown that this species can satisfy about 20% of its oxygen requirements in this manner, allowing for prolonged dives. The sea kraits (Laticauda spp.) are the sea snakes least adapted to aquatic life. Their bodies are less compressed laterally, and they have thicker bodies and ventral scaling. Because of this, they are capable of some land movement. They spend much of their time on land, where they lay their eggs and digest prey.

== Distribution ==
Terrestrial elapids are found worldwide in tropical and subtropical regions, mostly in the Southern Hemisphere. Most prefer humid tropical environments, though there are many that can still be found in arid environments. Sea snakes occur mainly in the Indian Ocean and the south-west Pacific. They occupy coastal waters and shallows, and are common in coral reefs. However, the range of Hydrophis platurus extends across the Pacific to the coasts of Central and South America.

== Venom ==
Venoms of species in the Elapidae are mainly neurotoxic for immobilizing prey and defense. The main group of toxins are PLA2 and three-finger toxins (3FTx). Other toxic components in some species comprise cardiotoxins and cytotoxins, which cause heart dysfunctions and cellular damage, respectively. Cobra venom also contains hemotoxins that clot or solidify blood. Most members are venomous to varying extents, and some are considered among the world's most venomous snakes based upon their murine LD_{50} values, such as the taipans. Large species, mambas and cobras included, are dangerous for their ability to inject large quantities of venom upon a single envenomation and/or striking at a high position proximal to the victim's brain, which is vulnerable to neurotoxicity. Antivenom is promptly required to be administered if bitten by any elapids. Specific antivenoms are the only cure to treat elapidae bites. There are commercial monovalent and polyvalent antivenoms for cobras, mambas, and some other important elapids. Recently, experimental antivenoms based on recombinant toxins have shown that it is feasible to create antivenoms with a wide spectrum of coverage.

The venom of spitting cobras is more cytotoxic rather than neurotoxic. It damages local cells, especially those in eyes, which are deliberately targeted by the snakes. The venom may cause intense pain on contact with the eye and may lead to blindness. It is not lethal on skin if no wound provides any chance for the toxins to enter the bloodstream.

== Taxonomy ==
The table below lists out all of the elapid genera and no subfamilies. In the past, many subfamilies were recognized, or have been suggested for the Elapidae, including the Elapinae, Hydrophiinae (sea snakes), Micrurinae (coral snakes), Acanthophiinae (Australian elapids), and the Laticaudinae (sea kraits). Currently, none are universally recognized. Molecular evidence via techniques like karyotyping, protein electrophoretic analyses, immunological distance and DNA sequencing, suggests reciprocal monophyly of two groups: African, Asian, and New World Elapinae versus Australasian and marine Hydrophiinae. The Australian terrestrial elapids are technically 'hydrophiines', although they are not sea snakes. It is believed that the Laticauda and the 'true sea snakes' evolved separately from Australasian land snakes. Asian cobras, coral snakes, and American coral snakes also appear to be monophyletic, while African cobras do not.

The type genus for the Elapidae was originally Elaps, but the group was moved to another family. In contrast to what is typical of botany, the family Elapidae was not renamed. In the meantime, Elaps was renamed Homoroselaps and moved back to the Elapidae. However, Nagy et al. (2005) regard it as a sister taxon to Atractaspis, which should have been assigned to the Atractaspididae.

Genus	Taxon author	Species	Subspecies*	Common name	Geographic range
Acanthophis	Daudin, 1803	8	0	death adders	Australia, New Guinea, Indonesia (Seram Island and Tanimbar)
Aipysurus	Lacépède, 1804	7	1	olive sea snakes	Timor Sea, South China Sea, Gulf of Thailand, and coasts of Australia (Northern Territory, Queensland, Western Australia), New Caledonia, Loyalty Islands, southern New Guinea, Indonesia, western Malaysia and Vietnam
Antaioserpens	Wells & Wellington, 1985	2	0	burrowing snakes	Australia
Aspidelaps	Fitzinger, 1843	2	4	shieldnose cobras	South Africa (Cape Province, Transvaal), Namibia, southern Angola, Botswana, Zimbabwe, Mozambique
Aspidomorphus	Fitzinger, 1843	3	3	collared adders	New Guinea
Austrelaps	Worrell, 1963	3	0	Australian copperheads	Australia (South Australia, New South Wales, Victoria, Tasmania)
Brachyurophis	Günther, 1863	7	0	shovel-nosed snakes	Australia
Bungarus	Daudin, 1803	12	4	kraits	India (incl. Andaman Islands), Myanmar, Nepal, Vietnam, Afghanistan, Pakistan, Sri Lanka, Bangladesh, Cambodia, Indonesia (Java, Sumatra, Bali, Sulawesi), Peninsular Malaysia, Singapore, Taiwan, Thailand
Cacophis	Günther, 1863	4	0	rainforest crowned snakes	Australia (New South Wales, Queensland)
Calliophis	Gray, 1834	15	11	Oriental coral snakes	India, Bangladesh, Sri Lanka, Nepal, Indonesia, Cambodia, Malaysia, Singapore, Thailand, Burma, Brunei, the Philippines, Vietnam, Laos, southern China, Japan (Ryukyu Islands), Taiwan
Cryptophis	Worrell, 1961	5	0		Australia and Papua New Guinea
Demansia	Gray, 1842	9	2	whipsnakes	New Guinea, continental Australia
Dendroaspis	Schlegel, 1848	4	1	mambas	Sub-Saharan Africa
Denisonia	Krefft, 1869	2	0	ornamental snakes	Central Queensland and central northern New South Wales, Australia
Drysdalia	Worrell, 1961	3	0	southeastern grass snakes	Southern Australia (Western Australia, South Australia, Victoria, Tasmania, New South Wales)
Echiopsis	Fitzinger, 1843	1	0	bardick	Southern Australia (Western Australia, South Australia, Victoria, New South Wales)
Elapognathus	Boulenger, 1896	2	0	southwestern grass snakes	Western Australia
Elapsoidea	Bocage, 1866	10	7	African or venomous garter snakes (not related to North American garter snakes, which are harmless to humans)	Sub-Saharan Africa
Emydocephalus	Krefft, 1869	3	0	turtlehead sea snakes	The coasts of Timor (Indonesian Sea), New Caledonia, Australia (Northern Territory, Queensland, Western Australia), and in the Southeast Asian Sea along the coasts of China, Taiwan, Japan, and the Ryukyu Islands
Ephalophis	M.A. Smith, 1931	1	0	Grey's mudsnake/ mangrove sea snake	Northwestern Australia
Furina	A.M.C. Duméril, 1853	5	0	pale-naped snakes	Mainland Australia, southern New Guinea, Aru Islands
Hemachatus	Fleming, 1822	1	0	rinkhals/ring-necked spitting cobra	South Africa, Zimbabwe, Lesotho, Eswatini
Hemiaspis	Fitzinger, 1861	2	0	swamp snakes	Eastern Australia (New South Wales, Queensland)
Hemibungarus	W. Peters, 1862	3	0	Barred coral snakes	Philippines (Luzon, Panay, Negros, Cebu, Mindoro, Catanduanes, Polillo is.)
Hoplocephalus	Wagler, 1830	3	0	broad-headed snakes	Eastern Australia (New South Wales, Queensland)
Hydrelaps	Boulenger, 1896	1	0	Port Darwin mudsnake	Northern Australia, southern New Guinea
Hydrophis	Latreille In Sonnini & Latreille, 1801	34	3	sea snakes	Indoaustralian and Southeast Asian waters.
Incongruelaps†		1	0		Riversleigh, Australia
Laticauda	Laurenti, 1768	5	0	sea kraits	Southeast Asian and Indo-Australian waters
Loveridgelaps	McDowell, 1970	1	0	Solomons small-eyed snake	Solomon Islands
Microcephalophis	Lesson, 1832	1	0	narrow-headed sea snake, graceful small-headed slender seasnake, common small-headed sea snake	on the coasts of the Indian Ocean and West Pacific, from around the Persian Gulf (Bahrain, Qatar, Saudi Arabia, Oman, United Arab Emirates (UAE), Iran, Iraq and Kuwait) to Pakistan, India, Sri Lanka, Bangladesh, Myanmar, Thailand, and Indonesia, and into the Malay Archipelago/West Pacific in Thailand, Malaysia, Singapore, Cambodia, Vietnam, the Philippines, southern China, Hong Kong, and Taiwan, as well as in Australia (Queensland) and Papua New Guinea
Micropechis	Boulenger, 1896	1	0	New Guinea small-eyed snake	New Guinea
Micruroides	K.P. Schmidt, 1928	1	2	Western coral snakes	United States (Arizona, southwestern New Mexico), Mexico (Sonora, Sinaloa)
Micrurus	Wagler, 1824	83	51	coral snakes	Southern North America, South America
Naja	Laurenti, 1768	39	3	cobras	Africa, Asia
Neelaps	(A.M.C. Duméril, Bibron & A.H.A. Duméril, 1854)	2	0		Australia
Notechis	Boulenger, 1896	1	0	tiger snake	Southern Australia, including many offshore islands
Ogmodon	W. Peters, 1864	1	0	bola	Fiji
Ophiophagus	Günther, 1864	4	1	King cobra	Bangladesh, Myanmar, Cambodia, China, India, Andaman Islands, Indonesia, Laos, Thailand, Vietnam, western Malaysia, the Philippines
Oxyuranus	Kinghorn, 1923	3	2	taipans	Australia, New Guinea
Parahydrophis	Burger & Natsuno, 1974	1	0	Northern mangrove sea snake	Northern Australia, southern New Guinea
Parapistocalamus	Roux, 1934	1	0	Hediger's snake	Bougainville Island, Solomons
Paroplocephalus	Keogh, Scott & Scanlon, 2000	1	0	Lake Cronin snake	Western Australia
Pseudechis	Wagler, 1830	7	0	black snakes (and king brown)	Australia
Pseudohaje	Günther, 1858	2	0	tree cobras	Angola, Burundi, Cameroon, Central African Republic, Democratic Republic of the Congo, Congo, Gabon, Ghana, Kenya, Nigeria, Rwanda, Uganda, Sierra Leone, Liberia, Ivory Coast, Togo, Nigeria
Pseudonaja	Günther, 1858	8	2	venomous brown snakes (and dugites)	Australia
Rhinoplocephalus	F. Müller, 1885	1	0	Müller's snake	Western Australia
Salomonelaps	McDowell, 1970	1	0	Solomons coral snake	Solomon Islands
Simoselaps	Jan, 1859	13	3	Australian coral snakes	Mainland Australia
Sinomicrurus	Slowinski, Boundy & Lawson, 2001	8	6	Asian coral snakes	Asia
Suta	Worrell, 1961	11	0	hooded snakes (and curl snake)	Australia
Thalassophis	P. Schmidt, 1852	1	0	anomalous sea snake	South Chinese Sea (Malaysia, Gulf of Thailand), Indian Ocean (Sumatra, Java, Borneo)
Toxicocalamus	Boulenger, 1896	11	0	New Guinea forest snakes	New Guinea (and nearby islands)
Tropidechis	Günther, 1863	1	0	rough-scaled snake	Eastern Australia
Vermicella	Gray in Günther, 1858	6	0	bandy-bandies	Australia
Walterinnesia	Lataste, 1887	2	0	black desert cobra	Egypt, Israel, Lebanon, Syria, Jordan, Iraq, Iran, Kuwait, Saudi Arabia, Turkey

* Not including the nominate subspecies

== Conservation ==
With the dangers the taxa presents given their venomous nature it is very difficult for activists and conservationists alike to get species on protection lists such as the IUCN red-list and CITES Appendix lists. Some of the protected species are:

- Vulnerable:
  - Ophiophagus hannah (King cobra)
  - Austrelaps labialis (Pygmy copperhead)
  - Denisonia maculate (Ornamental snake)
  - Echiopsis atriceps (Lake Cronin snake)
  - E. curta (Bardick)
  - Furina dunmalli (Dunmall's snake)
  - Hoplocephalus bungaroides (Broad-headed snake)
  - Ogmodon vitianus (Fiji snake)
- Lower Risk/Near threatened:
  - Elapognathus minor (Short-nosed snake)
  - Simoselaps calonotus (Black-striped snake)

This however does not touch the number of elapidae that are under threat, for instance 9% of elapid sea snakes are threatened with another 6% near-threatened. A rather large road block that stands in the way of more species being put under protection is lack of knowledge of the taxa; many known species have little research done on their behaviors or actual population as they live in very remote areas or live in habitats that are so vast its nearly impossible to conduct population studies, like the sea snakes.

== See also ==
- List of snake genera, overview of all snake families and genera
