= Becher Point Wetlands =

Wetlands in Western Australia

- Interactive map of Becher Point Wetlands
- Location: Port Kennedy, Western Australia
- Coordinates: 32°23′S 115°44′E

Ramsar Wetland
- Official name: Becher Point Wetlands
- Designated: 5 January 2001
- Reference no.: 1048

The Becher Point Wetlands site is a wetland nature reserve in Port Kennedy on the Swan Coastal Plain of south-western Western Australia. The 677-hectare (1,670-acre) coastal site lies in the City of Rockingham, about 50 kilometres (31 mi) south of the state capital, Perth, and is largely surrounded on the landward side by residential suburbs. It comprises about 200 very small wetlands among sand ridges between Becher Point the Perth-Mandurah Road.

== History and recognition ==
The nature reserve was established in 1996–97; the site is recognised as being of international importance under the Ramsar Convention on Wetlands, under which it was designated Ramsar Site 1048 on 5 January 2001. The sedgelands of the site are listed as a threatened ecological community under the Commonwealth Environment Protection and Biodiversity Conservation Act 1999. The site is also listed on Australia’s Register of the National Estate.

== Description ==
The reserve lies on the beach ridge plains adjoining the coast at Becher Point. Its wetlands are within 200–1,500 metres (660–4,920 ft) of the Indian Ocean. The wetlands are arranged in about ten groups roughly parallel to the coast, and separated by sand ridges. The system contains examples of shrub swamps and seasonal marshes formed in a sequence of inter-dunal swales resulting from coastal advancement over the last three thousand years, a type of wetland system rare in Southwest Australia. They form one of the youngest wetland systems on the Swan Coastal Plain and show a continuum of development in hydrology, geomorphology and vegetation unique in Western Australia.

Median and mean annual rainfall at Rockingham are 818 millimetres (32.2 in) and 826 millimetres (32.5 in) respectively, mainly falling in winter from May to August, while annual evaporation is about 1,900 millimetres (75 in). The site’s wetlands are seasonal; they normally lack surface water in summer and autumn. The fresh surface water of winter comes from rainfall and groundwater flow and is usually less than 0.3 metres (1 ft 0 in) deep.

== Flora and fauna ==
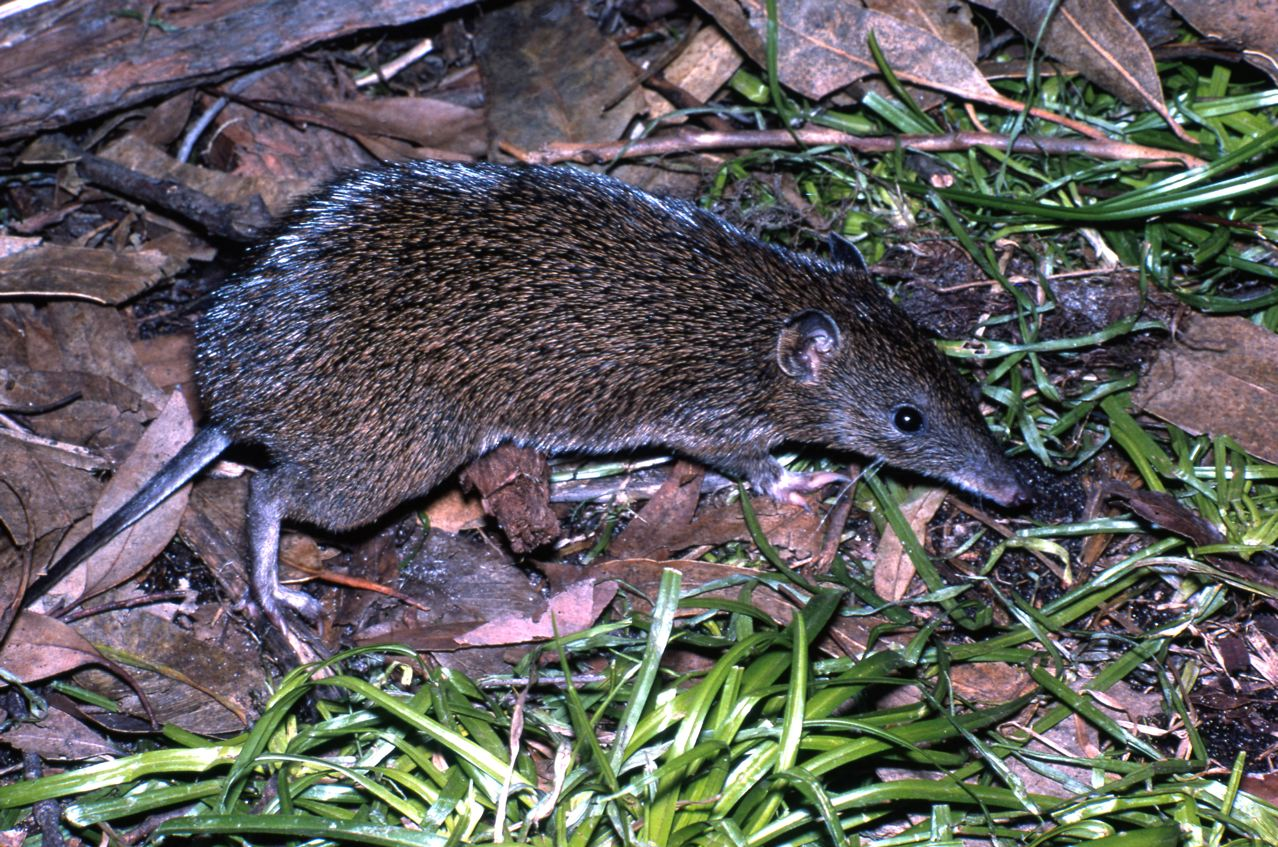
Southern brown bandicoot, or quenda

The swamps support sedgeland, tall open shrubland and low open forest or woodland. The sedgeland is dominated by Baumea articulata, B. juncea, Typha spp. and Lepidosperma spp. Schoenoplectus validus, Isolepis nodosa and Juncus kraussii also occur. The forest and woodland is dominated by the paperbarks Melaleuca rhaphiophylla, M. hamulosa, M. cuticularis and M. teretifolia. Surrounding areas support open heathland.

Native fauna found at the site include the quenda, southern carpet python and black-striped burrowing snake. At least four species of frog and 21 reptiles have been recorded.
