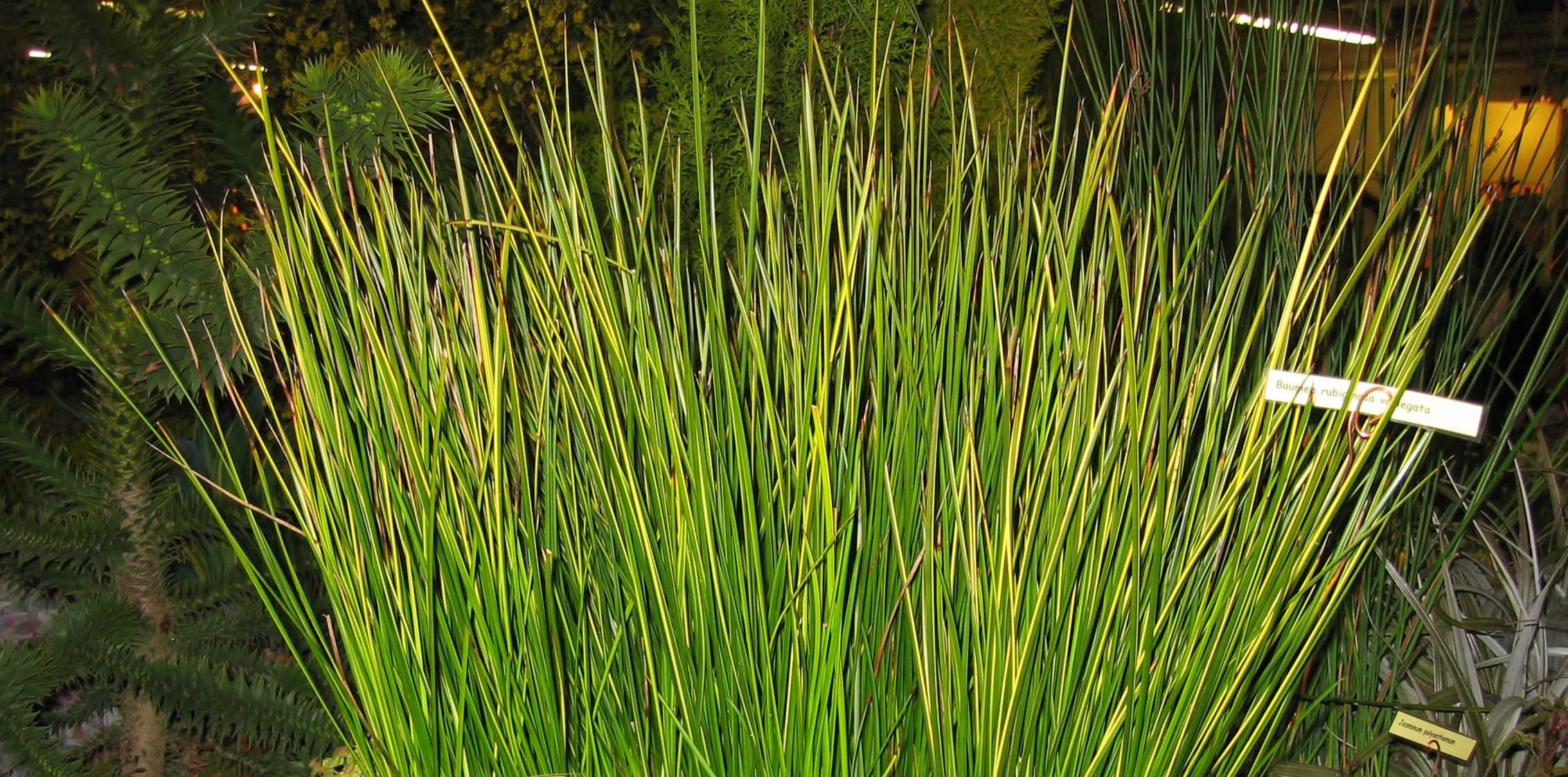
- Baumea rubiginosa in cultivation

Scientific classification
- Kingdom: Plantae
- Clade: Tracheophytes
- Clade: Angiosperms
- Clade: Monocots
- Clade: Commelinids
- Order: Poales
- Family: Cyperaceae
- Genus: Baumea; Gaudich.

Species
- See text

= Baumea =

Genus of grass-like plants

Baumea is a genus of the sedge family, which includes around 30 species native to Madagascar and the Pacific Islands, with 15 species in Australia. All are perennial rhizomatous herbs, with leaves and stems very similar in appearance. The inflorescence is terminal, with the flowers tightly clustered or loosely arranged. The fruits are small nuts.

It is closely related to the genus Machaerina, and is sometimes included in that genus.

== Habitat and cultivation ==
Most species occur in open moist habitats; many are found in swamps or seasonally inundated areas. Baumea is propagated from transplants, divisions, or from seeds, which germinate readily if sown on damp organic mix and kept moist until shoots appear.

== Selected species ==
- Baumea acuta (Labill.) Palla
- Baumea arthrophylla (Nees) Boeckeler
- Baumea articulata (R.Br.) S.T.Blake
- Baumea juncea (R.Br.) Palla
- Baumea laxa (Nees) Boeckeler
- Baumea preissii Nees
- Baumea riparia (Nees) Boeckeler
- Baumea rubiginosa (Spreng.) Boeckeler
- Baumea vaginalis (Benth.) S.T.Blake
