= Jointed rush =

Jointed rush is a common name for several plants in the genus Juncus and may refer to:

- Juncus articulatus, native to the Northern hemisphere, commonly known as "jointed rush" in the United Kingdom
- Juncus kraussii, native to the Southern hemisphere, commonly known as "jointed rush" in Australia
- Baumea articulata, native to the Southern hemisphere, commonly known as "jointed rush" in Australia
