= Eucalyptus obesa =

Ninety Mile Tank mallee

Conservation status
- Near Threatened (IUCN 3.1)

Scientific classification
- Kingdom: Plantae
- Clade: Tracheophytes
- Clade: Angiosperms
- Clade: Eudicots
- Clade: Rosids
- Order: Myrtales
- Family: Myrtaceae
- Genus: Eucalyptus
- Species: E. obesa

Binomial name
- Eucalyptus obesa Brooker & Hopper

Species of eucalyptus

Eucalyptus obesa, commonly known as the Ninety Mile Tank mallee, is a species of mallee that is endemic to Western Australia. It has smooth, greyish to pale brown bark, usually lance-shaped adult leaves, flower buds in groups of between eleven and fifteen, creamy white flowers and shortened spherical to hemispherical fruit.

== Description ==
Eucalyptus obesa is a mallee that typically grows to a height of 2–6 mm (0.079–0.236 in) and forms a lignotuber. It has smooth greyish to brownish bark with loose ribbons of shed bark near the base, and a canopy that reaches almost to the ground. Young plants and coppice regrowth have egg-shaped, heart-shaped or elliptical leaves that are dull greyish green, 30–55 mm (1.2–2.2 in) long and 15–30 mm (0.59–1.18 in) wide. Adult leaves are the same shade of glossy dark green on both sides, lance-shaped to elliptical, 65–105 mm (2.6–4.1 in) long and 8–20 mm (0.31–0.79 in) wide, tapering to a petiole 7–22 mm (0.28–0.87 in) long. The flower buds are arranged in leaf axils in groups of eleven or thirteen on an unbranched peduncle 3–10 mm (0.12–0.39 in) long, the individual buds sessile. Flowering occurs from December to January and the flowers are creamy white. The fruit is a woody shortened spherical or hemispherical capsule 4–7 mm (0.16–0.28 in) long and 6–11 mm (0.24–0.43 in) wide with the valves near rim level.

== Taxonomy and naming ==
Eucalyptus obesa was first formally described in 1993 by Ian Brooker and Stephen Hopper in the journal Nuytsia, from specimens collected by Brooker north-west of Tarin Rock. The specific epithet (obesa) is from the Latin obesus meaning "fat", referring to the buds, compared to the spindle-shaped buds of E. decipiens.

== Distribution and habitat ==
The Ninety Mile Tank mallee is found from north-west of Lake Grace to the 90-mile Tank and Peak Charles where it grows in sandy soils.

== Conservation status ==
This eucalypt is classified as "not threatened" by the Government of Western Australia Department of Parks and Wildlife. The IUCN Red List assesses the species as Near Threatened.

== See also ==
- List of Eucalyptus species
