= Baumea arthrophylla =

Scientific classification
- Kingdom: Plantae
- Clade: Tracheophytes
- Clade: Angiosperms
- Clade: Monocots
- Clade: Commelinids
- Order: Poales
- Family: Cyperaceae
- Genus: Baumea
- Species: B. arthrophylla

Binomial name
- Baumea arthrophylla (Nees) Boeckeler

Species of grass-like plant

Baumea arthrophylla (now known as Machaerina arthrophylla) is a flowering plant in the sedge family, Cyperaceae that is native to many states and territories of Australia.

The grass-like plant is rhizomatous and perennial, with a tufted habit. It typically grows to a height of 0.35 to 1.2 metres (1.1 to 3.9 ft). It blooms between September and November producing brown flowers.

It is found in winter wet depressions and around swamps and lakes along coastal areas in the Peel, South West, Great Southern and Goldfields-Esperance where it grows in damp to wet peaty-sand soils.

Commonly confused with Machaerina rubiginosa (syn. Baumea rubiginosa), which has larger, less angular nuts, leaves and involucral bracts somewhat flattened at least near the apex, and more densely clustered spikelets.
