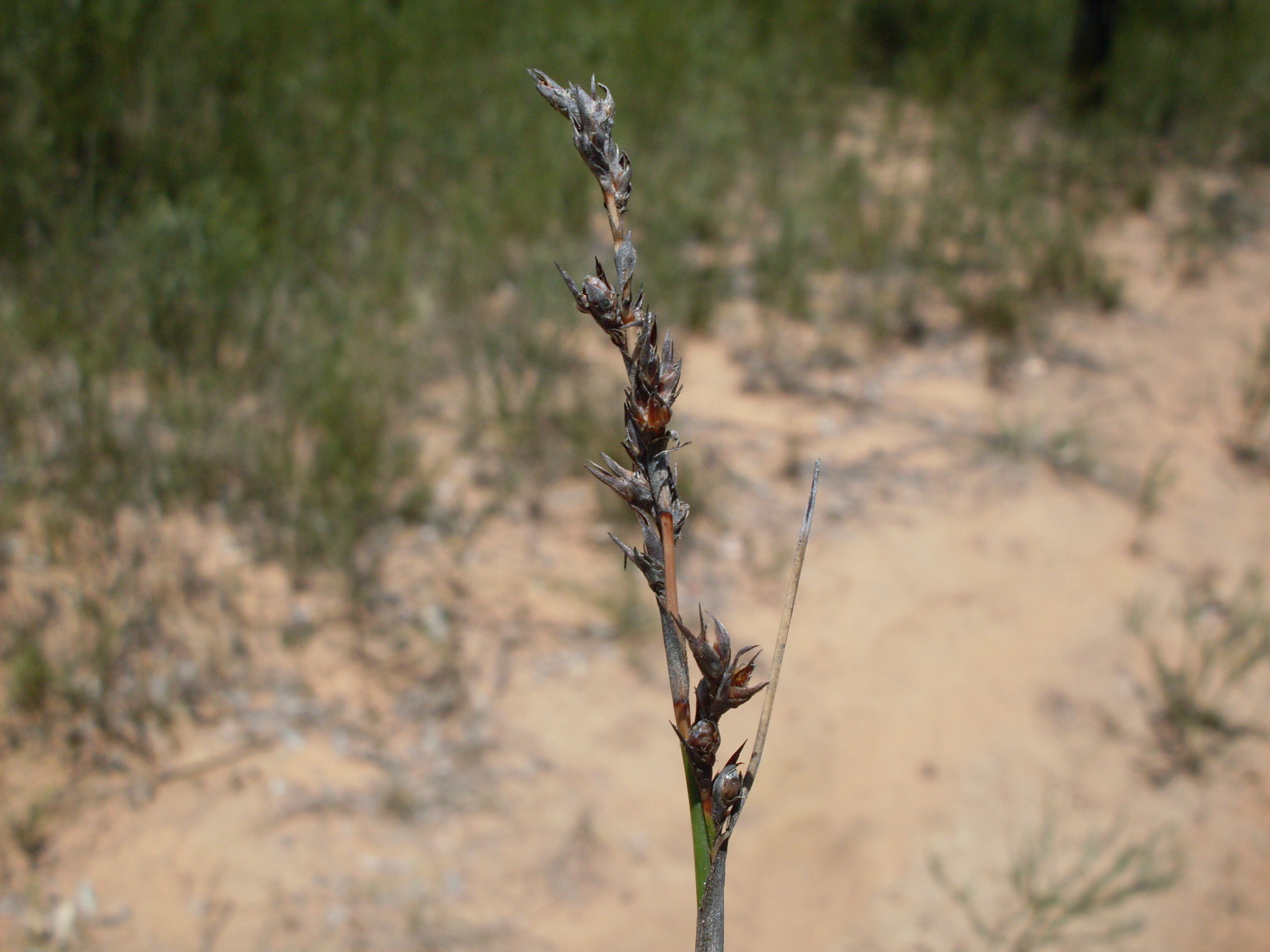

Scientific classification
- Kingdom: Plantae
- Clade: Tracheophytes
- Clade: Angiosperms
- Clade: Monocots
- Clade: Commelinids
- Order: Poales
- Family: Cyperaceae
- Genus: Baumea
- Species: B. acuta

Binomial name
- Baumea acuta (Labill.) Palla?

= Baumea acuta =

Pale twig-rush

Species of plant

Baumea acuta, commonly known as pale twig-rush, is a flowering plant in the sedge family, Cyperaceae, that is native to southern parts of Australia.

== Description ==
The grass-like plant is rhizomatous and perennial. It typically grows to a height of 0.2 to 0.4 metres (0.7 to 1.3 ft) and to a width of approximately 1 metre (3.3 ft). It blooms between September and November producing brown flowers.

== Taxonomy ==
The species was first formally described as Schoenus acutus by Jacques Labillardière in 1805. In 1902 Eduard Palla reclassified the species as Baumea acuta as part of the work Allgemeine Botanische Zeitschrift fur Systematik. Several other synonyms exist including Baumea schoenoides, Mariscus acutus, Machaerina schoenoides, Chapelliera schoenoides and Cladium acutum.

== Distribution ==
It is found along the southern half of the east and west coast of mainland Australia and in coastal areas of Tasmania. On the east coast it extends from coastal areas in southern Queensland, New South Wales and Victoria extending in the far east on the coast of South Australia. It often occurs in dense thickets in winter wet depressions and around swamps along coastal areas in the Peel, South West, Great Southern and Goldfields-Esperance of Western Australia where it grows in damp sandy soils.
