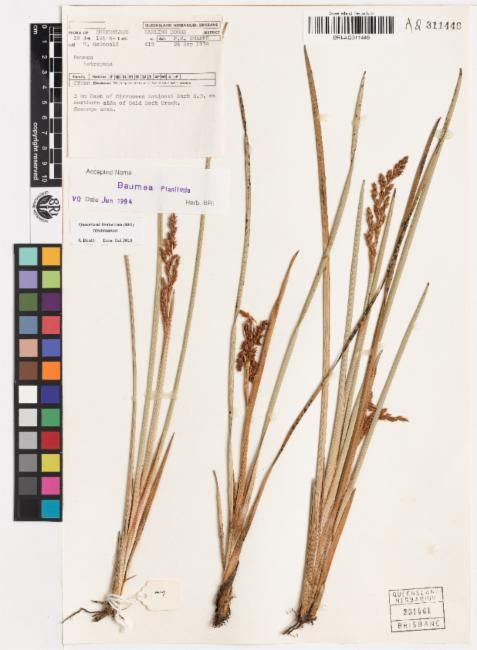
- specimen BRI AQ0311446, collected east of Girraween National Park in a seepage area

Scientific classification
- Kingdom: Plantae
- Clade: Tracheophytes
- Clade: Angiosperms
- Clade: Monocots
- Clade: Commelinids
- Order: Poales
- Family: Cyperaceae
- Genus: Machaerina
- Species: M. planifolia

Binomial name
- Machaerina planifolia (Benth.) K.L.Wilson

Synonyms
- Baumea planifolia (Benth.) K.L.Wilson; Cladium teretifolium var. planifolium (Benth.) Domin; Cladium teretifolium f. planifolium (Benth.) Kük. Cladium tetraquetrum var. planifolium Benth.

= Machaerina planifolia =

Species in the Cyperaceae family (native to Australia)

Machaerina planifolia is a flowering plant in the sedge family. The species was first described in 1878 as Cladium tetraquetrum var. planifolium by George Bentham. It was renamed several times, with its current name having been given in 2015 by Karen Wilson who reassigned to the genus, Machaerina.

It is found all of the eastern states of Australia (Tasmania, Victoria, New South Wales, and Queensland), on the coastal ranges.

It flowers from spring to summer and is found on sandy soils in swamps and near mountain streams.
