= Becher Point =

Point of Warnbro Sound in Port Kennedy, Western Australia

Coordinates: 32.3709°S 115.7169°E

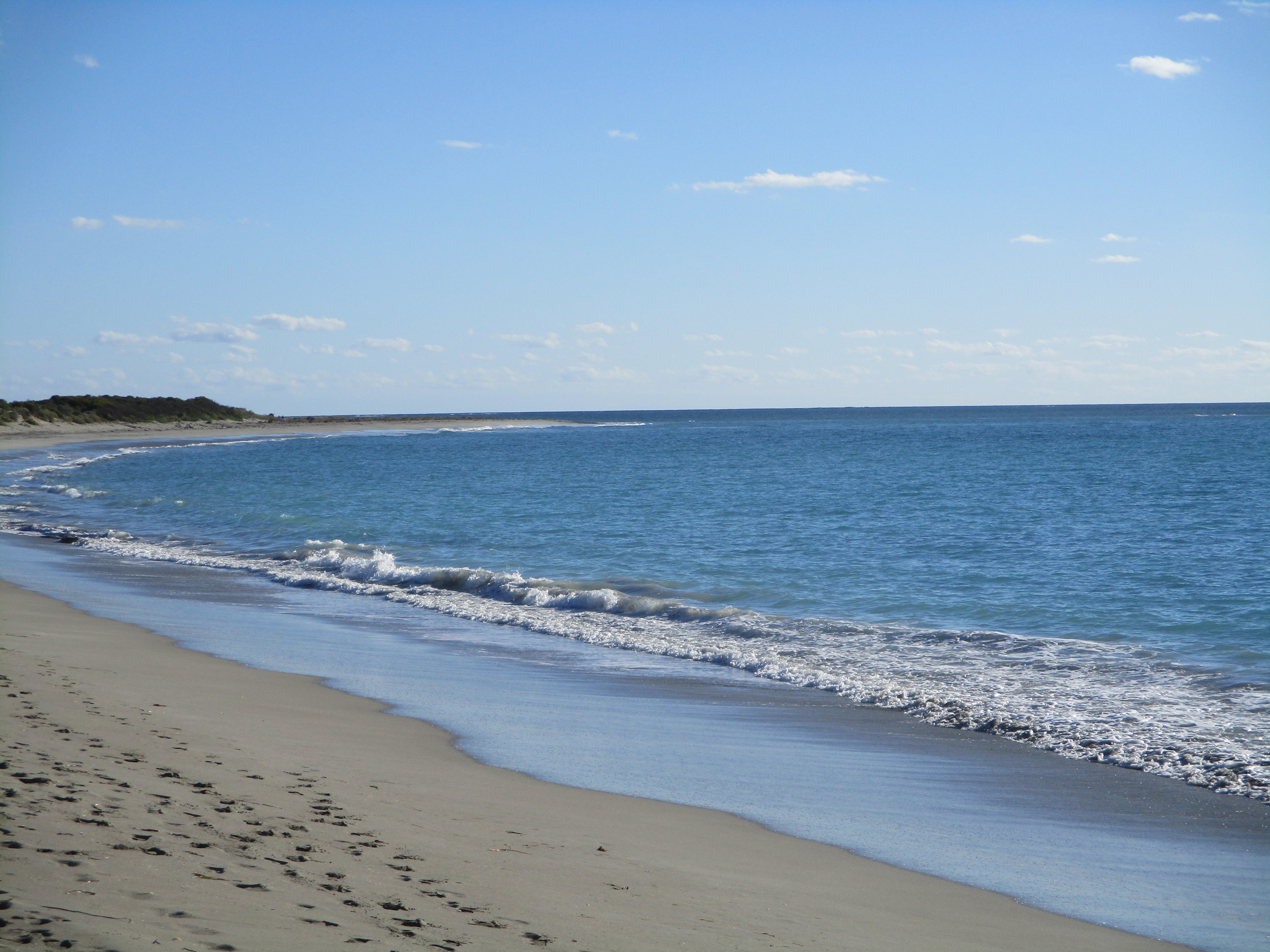
Becher Point, seen from near the Port Kennedy boat ramp

Becher Point is the southernmost point of Warnbro Sound in Port Kennedy in Western Australia. It was the site of multiple ship beachings. It is a reference point for the adjacent Ramsar Becher Point Wetlands that lie inland from the point. It offers significant conservation value. It has been identified as a site for assessing Holocene environment on the coastline. As a place name, Port Kennedy is the name of a locality that is found where Becher point is, however Port Kennedy is not a notable coastal feature.
