= Baumea vaginalis =

Sheath twig rush

Scientific classification
- Kingdom: Plantae
- Clade: Tracheophytes
- Clade: Angiosperms
- Clade: Monocots
- Clade: Commelinids
- Order: Poales
- Family: Cyperaceae
- Genus: Baumea
- Species: B. vaginalis

Binomial name
- Baumea vaginalis (Benth.) S.T.Blake

Species of grass-like plant

Baumea vaginalis, commonly known as sheath twig rush, is a flowering plant in the sedge family, Cyperaceae, that is native to Western Australia.

The robust grass-like sedge is rhizomatous and perennial and has a tufted habit, it typically grows to a height of 0.6 to 1.5 metres (2.0 to 4.9 ft) and to a width of 1.5 metres (4.9 ft). It blooms between October and November producing brown flowers.

It can be found in wet depressions, swamps and on the margins of lakes and creeks along coastal areas in the Peel, South West and Great Southern regions where it grows in dark brown sandy soils.
