= Baumea riparia =

Scientific classification
- Kingdom: Plantae
- Clade: Tracheophytes
- Clade: Angiosperms
- Clade: Monocots
- Clade: Commelinids
- Order: Poales
- Family: Cyperaceae
- Genus: Baumea
- Species: B. riparia

Binomial name
- Baumea riparia (Nees) Boeckeler

Species of grass-like plant

Baumea riparia is a flowering plant in the sedge family, Cyperaceae that is native to Western Australia.

The robust grass-like sedge is rhizomatous and perennial, it typically grows to a height of 0.3 to 1.6 metres (1.0 to 5.2 ft) and colonises easily. It blooms between August and October producing brown flowers.

It found in swamps and on the margins of brackish lakes and creeks in the Peel, South West and Great Southern where it grows in black peaty-sand soils.
