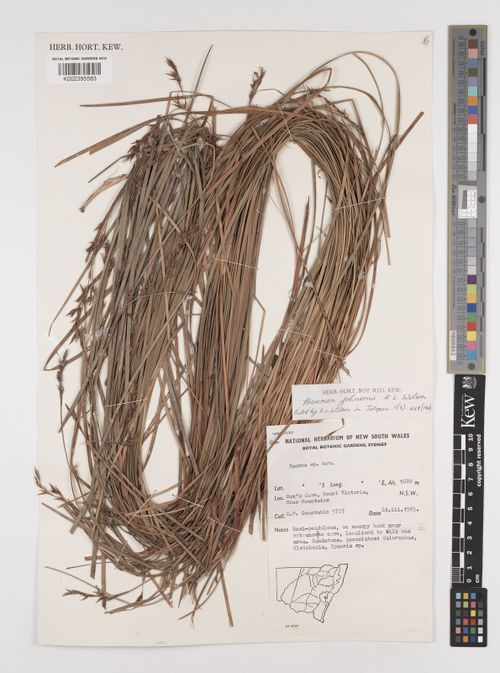
- Kew Harbarium (K002395583)

Scientific classification
- Kingdom: Plantae
- Clade: Tracheophytes
- Clade: Angiosperms
- Clade: Monocots
- Clade: Commelinids
- Order: Poales
- Family: Cyperaceae
- Genus: Machaerina
- Species: M. johnsonii

Binomial name
- Machaerina johnsonii (K.L.Wilson) K.L.Wilson

Synonyms
- Baumea johnsonii K.L.Wilson

= Machaerina johnsonii =

Species in the Cyperaceae family

Machaerina johnsonii is a flowering plant in the sedge family. The species was first described in 1980 as Baumea johnsonii by Karen Wilson, who reassigned it in 2015 to the genus, Machaerina. The species epithet honours L.A.S. Johnson.

It is found only in New South Wales, with the type specimen having been collected at Govetts Leap in the Blue Mountains.

It flowers from spring to summer and is found in sheltered, permanently damp positions below cliffs and along creeks.
