= Baumea laxa =

Scientific classification
- Kingdom: Plantae
- Clade: Tracheophytes
- Clade: Angiosperms
- Clade: Monocots
- Clade: Commelinids
- Order: Poales
- Family: Cyperaceae
- Genus: Baumea
- Species: B. laxa

Binomial name
- Baumea laxa (Nees) Boeckeler

Species of grass-like plant

Baumea laxa is a flowering plant in the sedge family, Cyperaceae, that is native to Western Australia.

The grass-like plant is found along coastal areas in the Peel, South West, and Great Southern regions where it grows in damp sandy soils.
