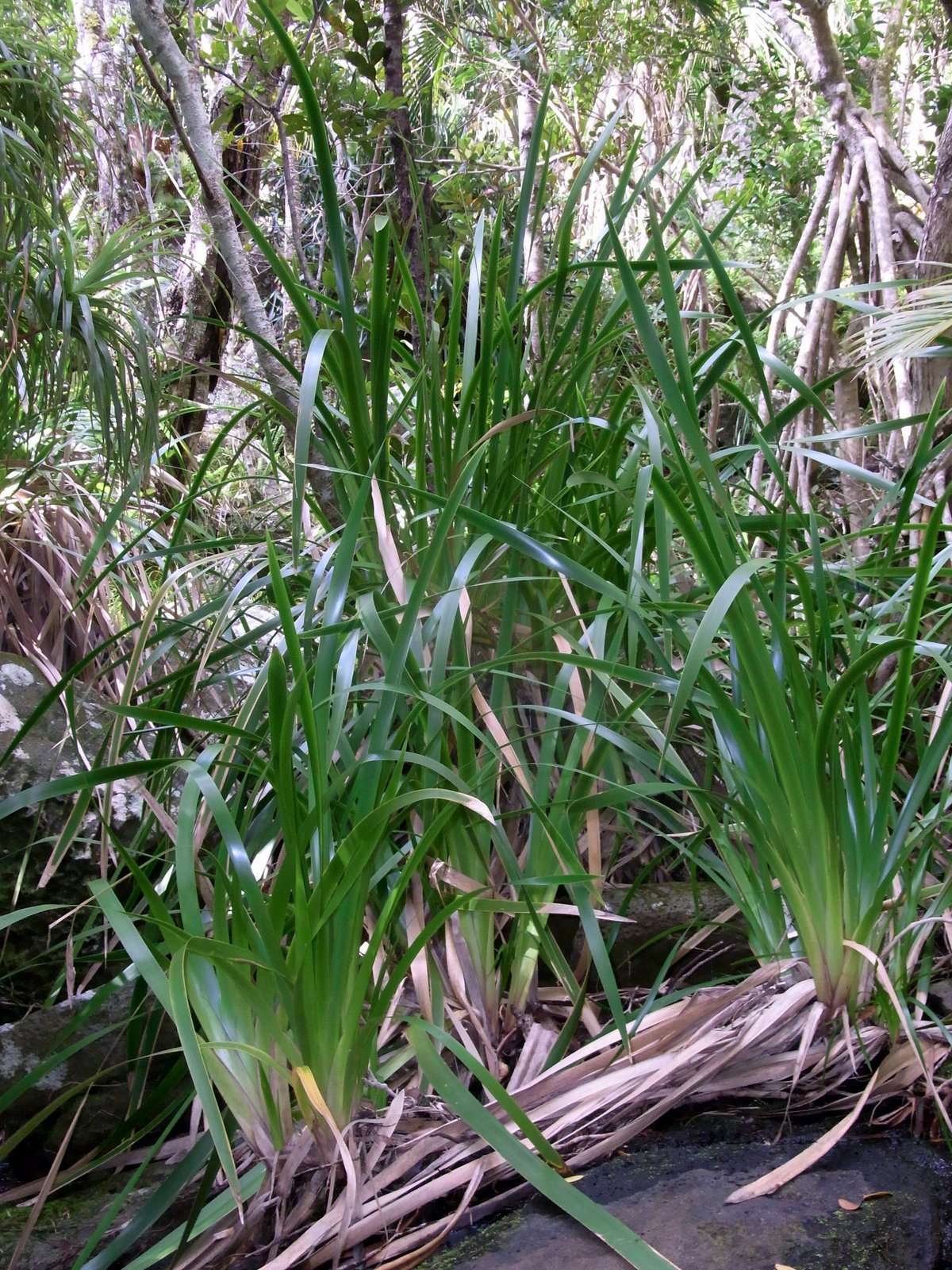

Scientific classification
- Kingdom: Plantae
- Clade: Tracheophytes
- Clade: Angiosperms
- Clade: Monocots
- Clade: Commelinids
- Order: Poales
- Family: Cyperaceae
- Genus: Machaerina
- Species: M. insularis

Binomial name
- Machaerina insularis (Benth.) T.Koyama (1956)

Synonyms
- Cladium insulare Benth. (1878); Gahnia insularis (Benth.) F.Muell. (1889)

= Machaerina insularis =

Species of grass-like plant

Machaerina insularis is a flowering plant in the sedge family. The specific epithet is the Latin insularis (growing on an island), alluding to its island home.

== Description ==
It is a tufted perennial sedge, with erect, biconvex culms, growing to 1–2 m in height. The smooth leaves are mostly basal, 1–1.8 m long and 2–3 cm wide. The inflorescence is much branched and 10–20 cm in length. The fruits are narrowly ellipsoidal-trigonous brown nuts, 2 mm long.

== Distribution and habitat ==
The sedge is endemic to Australia’s subtropical Lord Howe Island in the Tasman Sea. It occurs on the rocky slopes and summits of Mounts Lidgbird and Gower at the southern end of the island.
