= Baumea preissii =

Scientific classification
- Kingdom: Plantae
- Clade: Tracheophytes
- Clade: Angiosperms
- Clade: Monocots
- Clade: Commelinids
- Order: Poales
- Family: Cyperaceae
- Genus: Baumea
- Species: B. preissii

Binomial name
- Baumea preissii Nees

Species of flowering plants

Baumea preissii is a flowering plant in the sedge family Cyperaceae, which is native to Western Australia.

The robust grass-like plant is rhizomatous and perennial; it typically grows to a height of 0.2 to 2 metres (0.7 to 6.6 ft), and colonises easily. It blooms between July and December, producing purple-brown flowers.

It is found in swamps and on the margins of lakes and creeks along coastal areas in the Wheatbelt, Peel, South West, Great Southern, and Goldfields-Esperance, where it grows in water-logged silty-sand soils.
