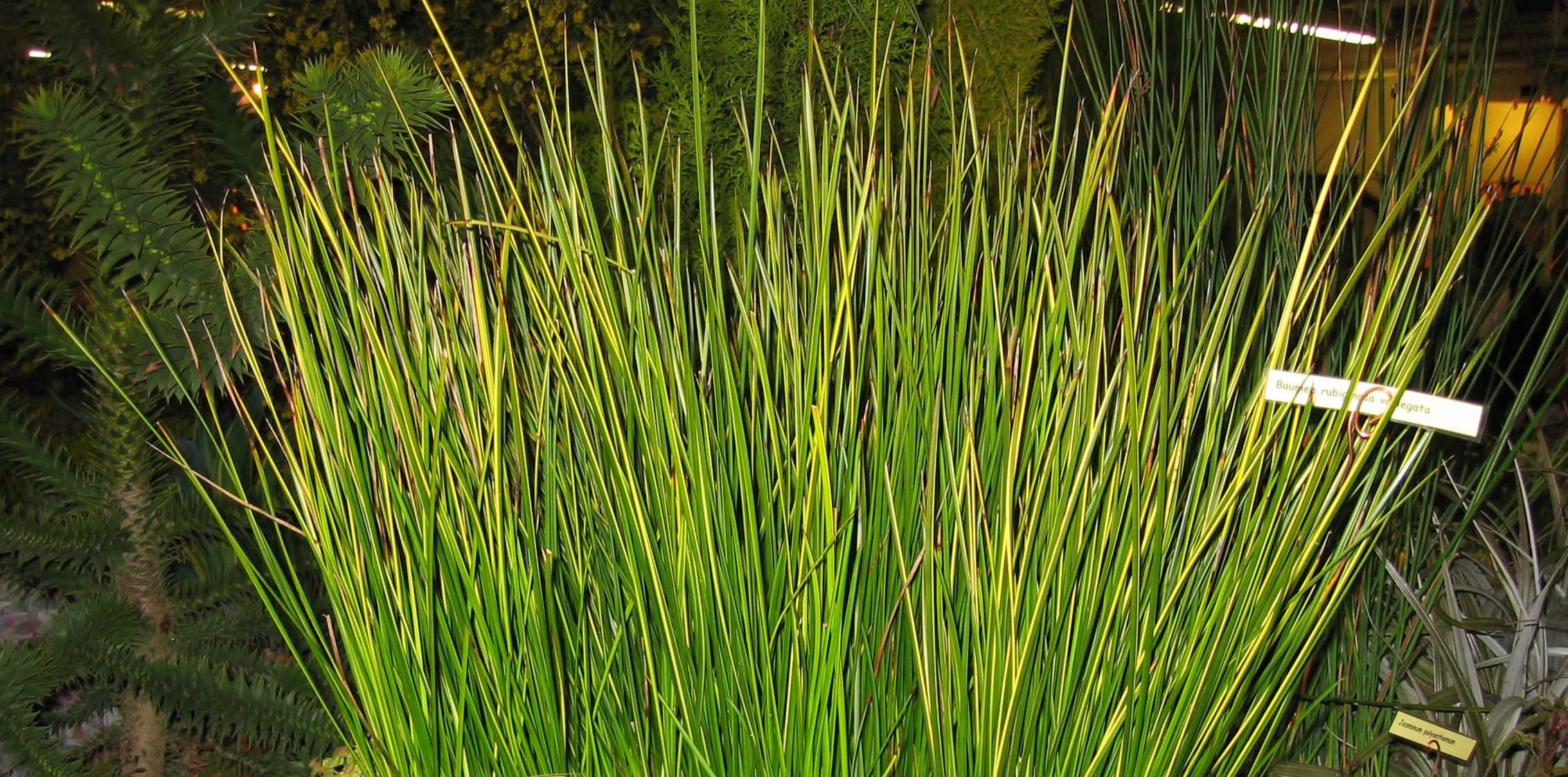
- In cultivation
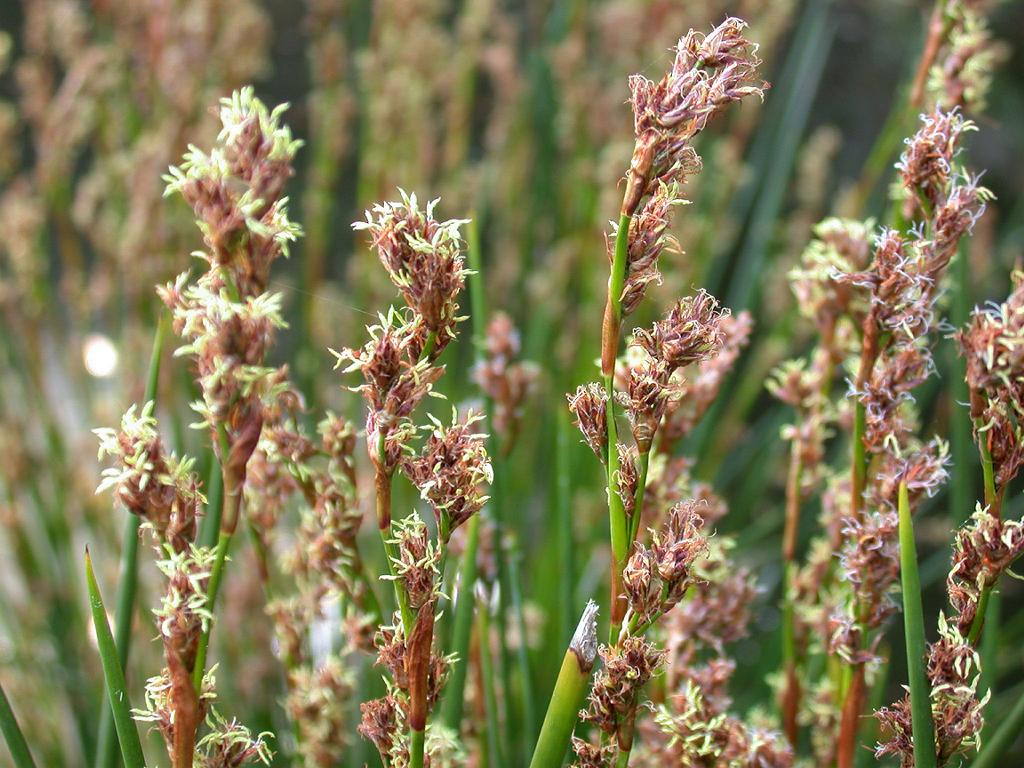

Scientific classification
- Kingdom: Plantae
- Clade: Tracheophytes
- Clade: Angiosperms
- Clade: Monocots
- Clade: Commelinids
- Order: Poales
- Family: Cyperaceae
- Genus: Machaerina
- Species: M. rubiginosa

Binomial name
- Machaerina rubiginosa (Spreng.) T.Koyama

= Machaerina rubiginosa =

Species of grass-like plant

Machaerina rubiginosa, commonly known as soft twig rush, flat leaf twig rush or common twig rush, is a flowering plant in the sedge family, Cyperaceae, that is native to Asia and the Pacific.

== Description ==
The robust grass-like sedge is rhizomatous and perennial, it typically grows to a height of 4 metres (13.1 ft) and a width of 2 m (6.6 ft). It blooms between August and March producing brown flowers. It has rigid, terete and biconvex culms that are smooth and glabrous. The culms are 20 to 110 centimetres (0.7 to 3.6 ft) in length and 1 to 5 millimetres (0.04 to 0.20 in) in diameter. The narrow and erect inflorescence has an interrupted-oblong shape in outline forming dense clusters that are around 7 to 20 cm (2.8 to 7.9 in) long and with a diameter of 1 to 2.5 cm (0.39 to 0.98 in). After flowering an ellipsoid to obovoid shaped pale red-brown to bright orange coloured nut. The nut is smooth with a hispid apex with a length of 2.2 to 4 mm (0.09 to 0.16 in) and a diameter of 1.2 to 2 mm (0.05 to 0.08 in).

== Distribution and habitat ==
It found in swamps and on the margins of lakes and streams along coastal areas in the Mid West, Wheatbelt, Peel, South West, Great Southern and Goldfields-Esperance regions where it grows in damp silty-sandy soils. It is also found in Queensland, Victoria, New South Wales, South Australia, Tasmania and the Northern Territory.

The upright foliage and spreading rhizomatous habit allow the plant to form large dense swards in wet areas. It can grow in nutrient poor soils in water up to a depth of around 50 centimetres (1.6 ft). The plant tends to grow taller in permanently damp areas and shorter in ephemeral environments. It is suitable for use in artificial wetlands.
