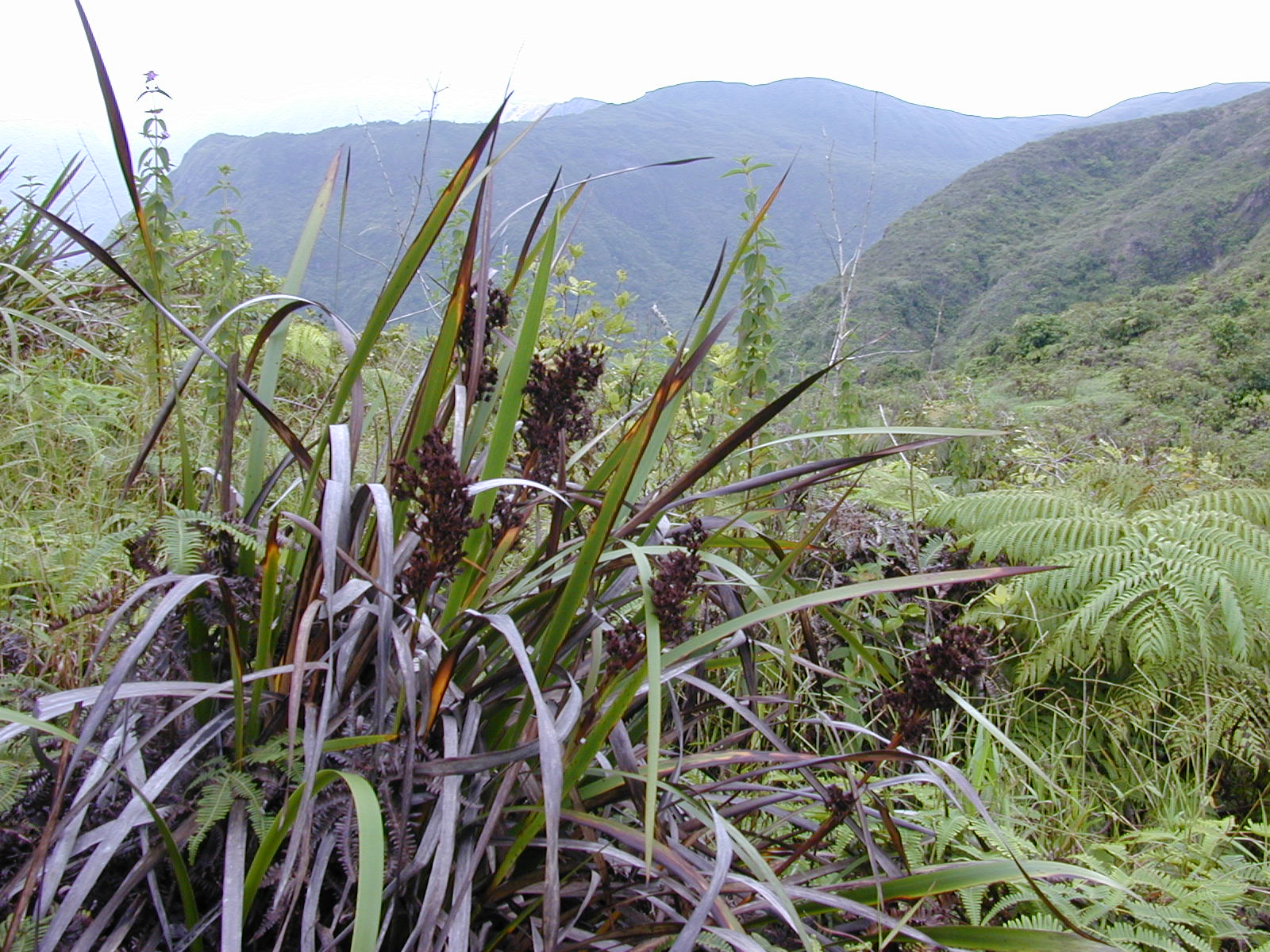
- Machaerina angustifolia on Maui, Hawaii

Scientific classification
- Kingdom: Plantae
- Clade: Embryophytes
- Clade: Tracheophytes
- Clade: Angiosperms
- Clade: Monocots
- Clade: Commelinids
- Order: Poales
- Family: Cyperaceae
- Genus: Machaerina; Vahl (1805)

Synonyms
- Agylla Phil.; Baumea Gaudich.; Chapelliera Nees; Terobera Steud.; Trachyrhynchium Nees; Vincentia Gaudich.

= Machaerina =

Genus of flowering plants in the sedge family

Machaerina (twigrush) is a genus of flowering plants in the sedge family. Its species occur in tropical America, the West Indies, Malesia, Australia and the Pacific region. The name comes from the Greek machaira (a large knife), alluding to the shape of the leaves in the type species – Machaerina restioides.

== Description ==
The species in the genus are rhizomatous perennials. The leaves are mainly basal, with a few cauline, laterally compressed, distichous and equitant at base. The culms are tufted and pithy. The inflorescence consists of several partial panicles. The flowers may be bisexual or male.

== Species ==
52 species are accepted.

- Machaerina abbreviata (Nees) R.L.Barrett & K.L.Wilson
- Machaerina acuta (Labill.) J.Kern
- Machaerina anceps (Poir.) Bojer
- Machaerina angustifolia (Gaudich.) T.Koyama
- Machaerina arthrophylla (Nees) T.Koyama
- Machaerina articulata (R.Br.) T.Koyama
- Machaerina ascendens R.L.Barrett & K.L.Wilson
- Machaerina aspericaulis (Kük.) T.Koyama
- Machaerina austrobrasiliensis M.T.Strong
- Machaerina ayangannensis M.T.Strong
- Machaerina bidwellii (Stapf ex Setch.) T.Koyama
- Machaerina complanata (Berggr.) T.Koyama
- Machaerina cubensis (Kük.) T.Koyama
- Machaerina deplanchei (Boeckeler) T.Koyama
- Machaerina disticha (C.B.Clarke) T.Koyama
- Machaerina effusa (Griseb.) M.T.Strong
- Machaerina ekmanii (Kük.) T.Koyama
- Machaerina ensifolia (Boeckeler) T.Koyama
- Machaerina ensigera (Hance) T.Koyama
- Machaerina falcata (Nees) T.Koyama
- Machaerina ficticia (Hemsl.) T.Koyama
- Machaerina filifolia Griseb.
- Machaerina flexuosa (Boeckeler) J.Kern
- Machaerina glomerata (Gaudich.) T.Koyama
- Machaerina gunnii (Hook.f.) J.Kern
- Machaerina huttonii (Kirk) T.Koyama
- Machaerina insularis (Benth.) T.Koyama
- Machaerina iridifolia (Bory) T.Koyama
- Machaerina johnsonii (K.L.Wilson) K.L.Wilson
- Machaerina juncea (R.Br.) T.Koyama
- Machaerina lamii (Kük.) J.Kern
- Machaerina laxa (Nees) T.Koyama
- Machaerina maingayi (C.B.Clarke) T.Koyama
- Machaerina mariscoides (Gaudich.) J.Kern
- Machaerina milnei (C.B.Clarke) T.Koyama
- Machaerina montana (J.Raynal) Lye
- Machaerina monticola (Guillaumin) T.Koyama
- Machaerina muelleri (C.B.Clarke) T.Koyama
- Machaerina myriantha (Chun & F.C.How) Y.C.Tang
- Machaerina nukuhivensis (F.Br.) T.Koyama
- Machaerina planifolia (Benth.) K.L.Wilson
- Machaerina preissii (Nees) L.A.S.Johnson & Koyama
- Machaerina raiateensis (J.W.Moore) S.L.Welsh
- Machaerina restioides (Sw.) Vahl
- Machaerina rubiginosa (Spreng.) T.Koyama
- Machaerina scirpoidea (Steud.) T.Koyama
- Machaerina sinclairii (Hook.f.) T.Koyama
- Machaerina tenax (Hook.f.) T.Koyama
- Machaerina teretifolia (R.Br.) T.Koyama
- Machaerina tetragona (Labill.) T.Koyama
- Machaerina vaginalis (Benth.) T.Koyama
- Machaerina veillonis (J.Raynal) K.L.Wilson
