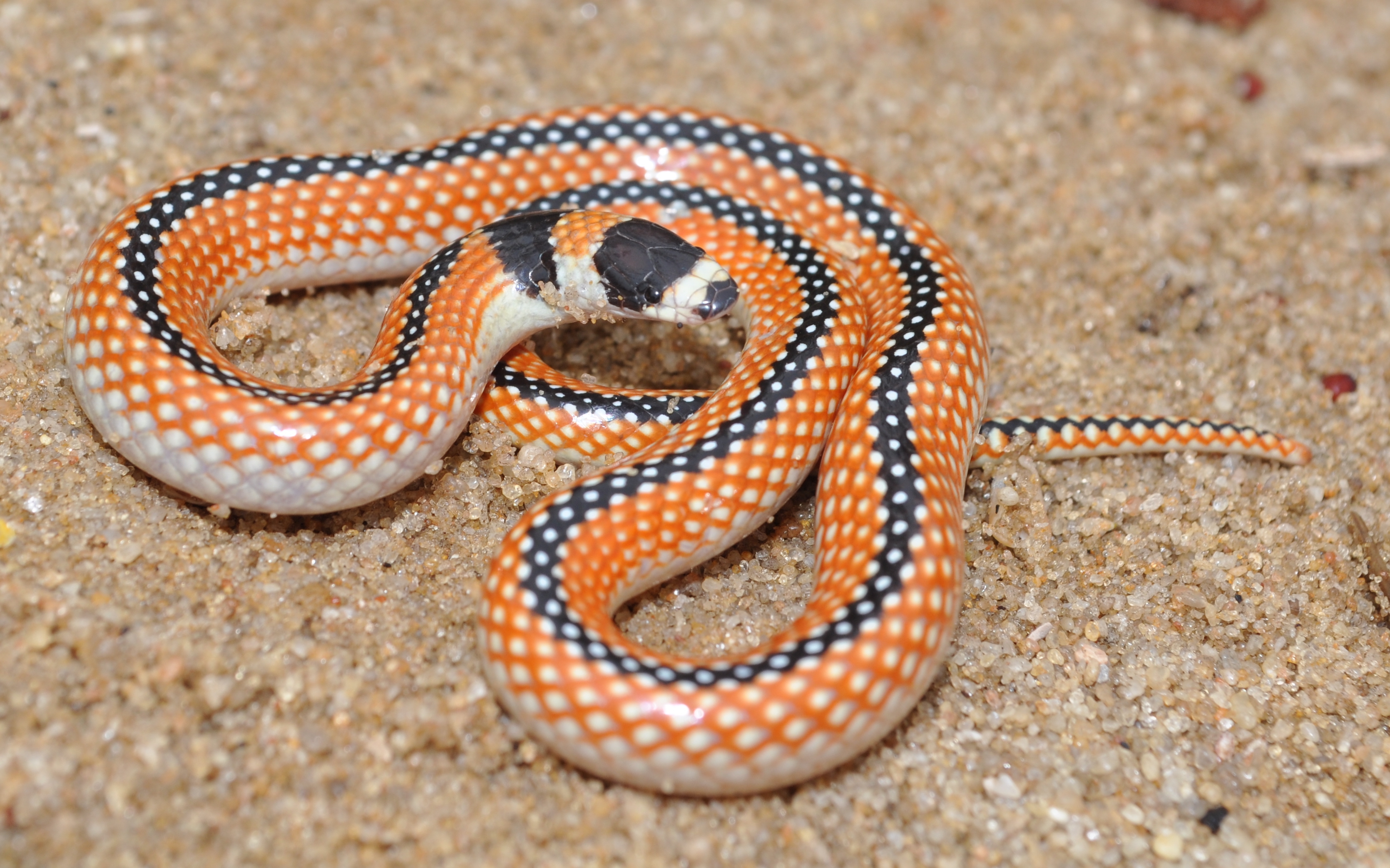

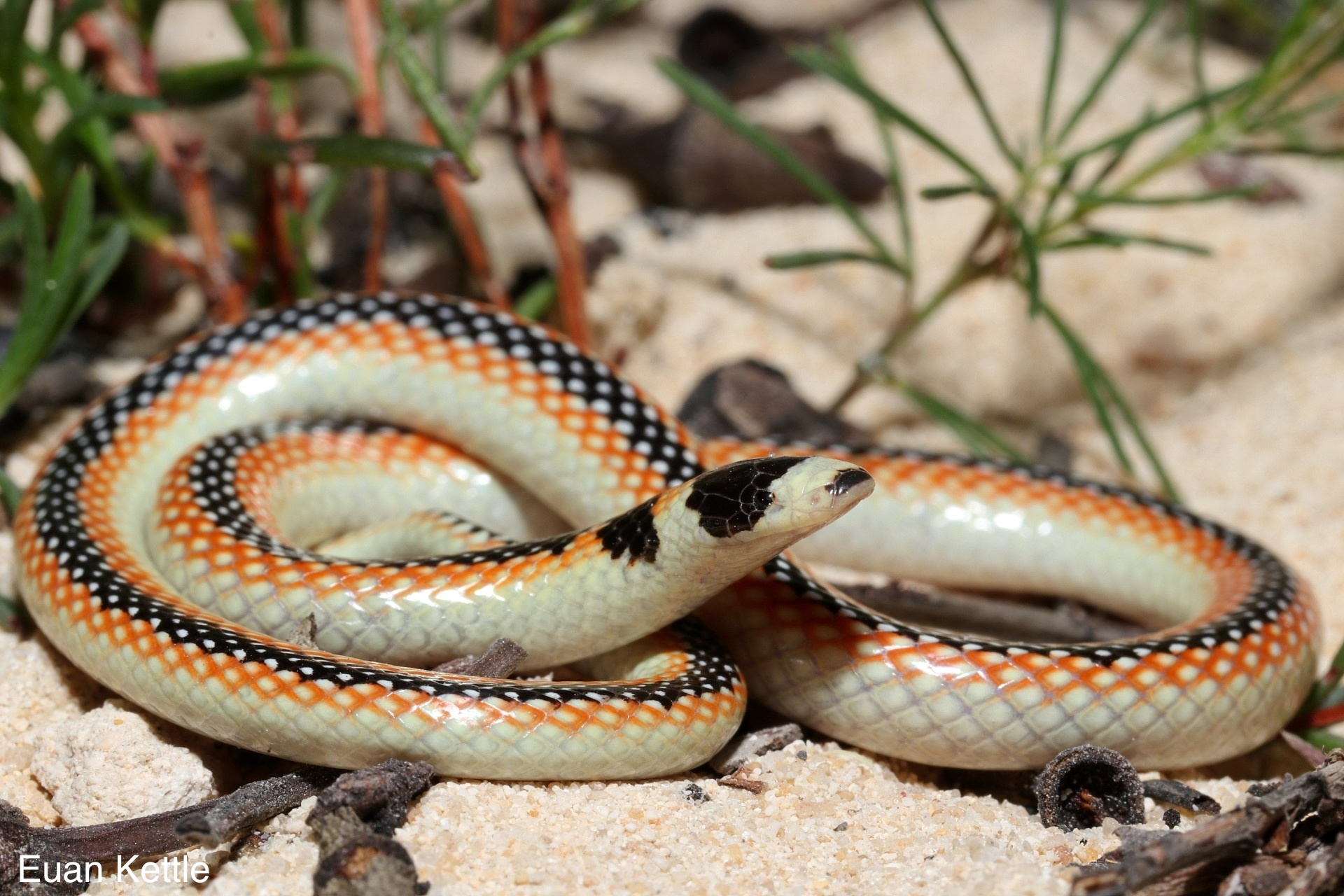

Conservation status
- Near Threatened (IUCN 3.1)

Scientific classification
- Kingdom: Animalia
- Phylum: Chordata
- Class: Reptilia
- Order: Squamata
- Suborder: Serpentes
- Family: Elapidae
- Genus: Neelaps
- Species: N. calonotos

Binomial name
- Neelaps calonotos (Duméril, Bibron & Duméril, 1854)

Synonyms
- Furina calonotos A.M.C. Duméril, Bibron & A.H.A. Duméril, 1854; Neelaps calonotus Günther, 1863; Furina calonota — Boulenger, 1896; Vermicella calonota — Glauert, 1950; Melwardia calonota — Worrell, 1960; Simoselaps calonotus — Cogger, 1992; Neelaps calonotus — S. Wilson & Swan, 2010

= Neelaps calonotos =

Species of Australian snake

Neelaps calonotos, also known commonly as the black-striped burrowing snake, the black-striped snake, and the western black-striped snake, is a species of mildly venomous burrowing snake endemic to Australia. The specific epithet calonotos ("beautiful-backed") refers to the patterning on the upper surface of the body.

== Description ==
Neelaps calonotos rarely grows to a length (including tail) of more than 28 cm (11 in), and is considered to be Australia's smallest venomous snake. Females are larger than males. Dorsally, it is reddish-orange, with a narrow black stripe along the back. The belly is whitish. Three black patches cover the snout, top of the head, and the nape.

== Reproduction ==
Neelaps calonotos is oviparous, with an average clutch size of four (range 2–6).

== Behaviour and diet ==
Neelaps calonotos is nocturnal, staying in loose sand during the day and preying on small animals such as lizards at night.

== Geographic range and habitat ==
Neelaps calonotos occurs in coastal south-western Western Australia. It lives in dunes as well as open woodlands and shrublands with sandy soils.
