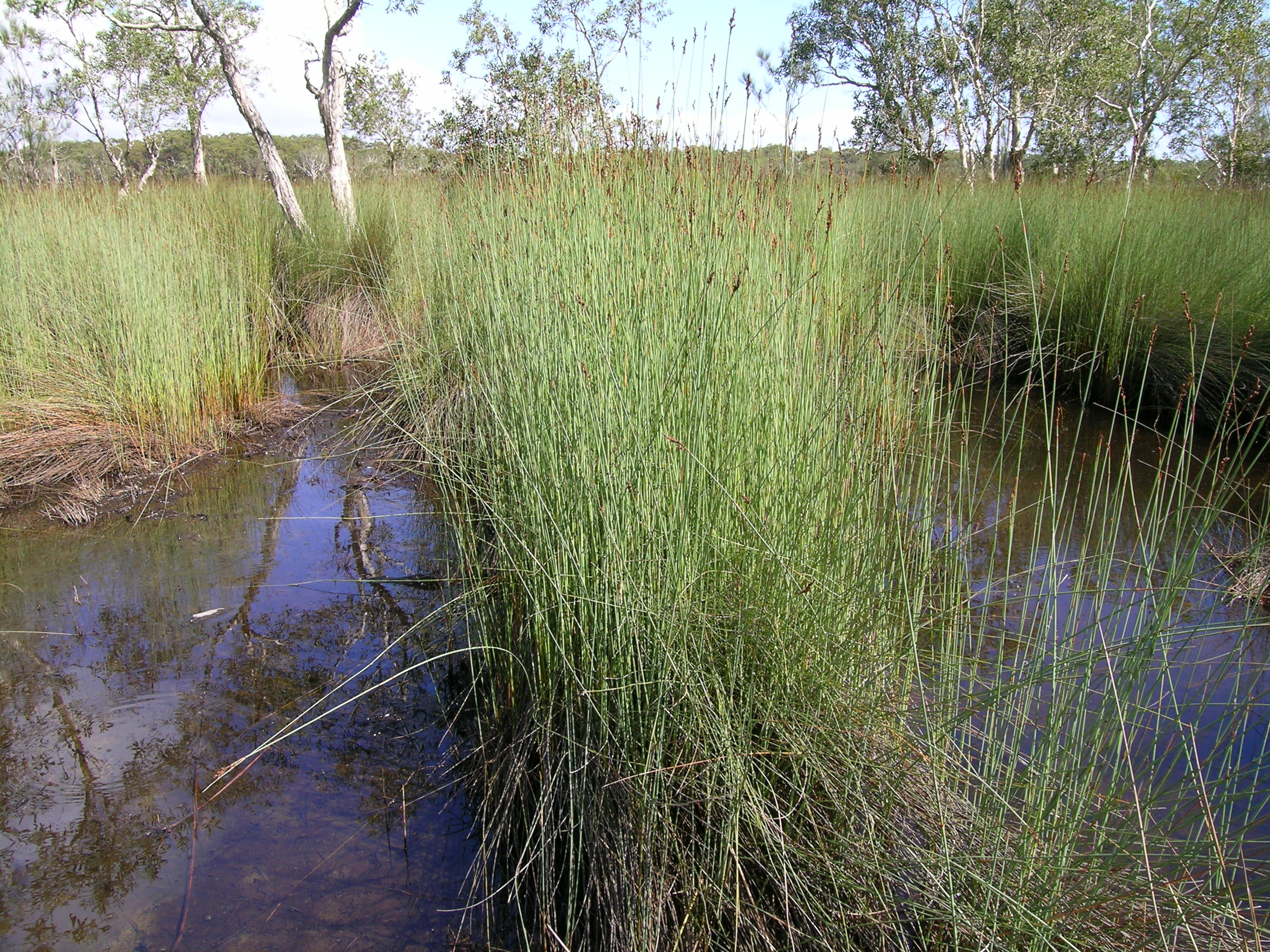

Scientific classification
- Kingdom: Plantae
- Clade: Tracheophytes
- Clade: Angiosperms
- Clade: Monocots
- Clade: Commelinids
- Order: Poales
- Family: Cyperaceae
- Genus: Machaerina
- Species: M. juncea

Binomial name
- Machaerina juncea (R.Br.) T.Koyama

Synonyms
- Baumea juncea (R.Br.) Palla; Chapelliera juncea (R.Br.) Nees; Cladium junceum R.Br.; Cladium ouveanum (Däniker) Guillaumin; Gahnia juncea (R.Br.) F.Muell.; Lepidosperma colensoi Boeckeler; Mariscus junceus (R.Br.) Kuntze; Mariscus ouveanus Däniker

= Machaerina juncea =

Bare twig-rush

Species of grass-like plant

Machaerina juncea, commonly known as bare twig-rush or tussock swamp twig rush, is a sedge in the sedge family, Cyperaceae, that is native to Australia, New Zealand, and New Caledonia.

== Description ==
The grass-like sedge is rhizomatous and perennial. It typically grows to a height of 0.2 to 1.2 metres (0.7 to 3.9 ft) and colonises easily. The woody and shortly creeping rhizome has a diameter of 3 to 10 millimetres (0.118 to 0.394 in) and is covered in light brown papery, loose, imbricate bracts. The terete, rigid, erect, smooth, glaucous culms arise as crowded tufts along rhizome and have one to two distant nodes. The leaves are light brown or reddish sheathing bracts. It blooms between October and March producing brown flowers. Each stiff, erect, spike-like and sparingly branched inflorescence has a length of 25 to 100 mm (1.0 to 3.9 in) and has a much shorter sheathing bract underneath. The red-brown coloured spikelets have a length of 4 to 5 mm (0.157 to 0.197 in) and contain one or two flowers. The oblong to ovoid shaped nut that forms later has a length of 2.5 to 3 mm (0.098 to 0.118 in) and is dark brown to black and orange near the base.

== Taxonomy ==
The species was first formally described by the botanist Tetsuo Koyama in 1956 as part of the work Taxonomic Study of Cyperaceae as published in Botanical Magazine (Tokyo). Many synonyms are known including; Baumea juncea, Chapelliera juncea, Cladium junceum, Cladium ouveanum, Gahnia juncea, Lepidosperma colensoi, Mariscus junceus and Mariscus ouveanus.

== Distribution ==
It is found in New Zealand, commonly found on the North Island and less frequently on the South Island. It is found in coastal areas to lower montane in and around swamps, salt marshes, lake margins and river estuaries.

It is found in coastal areas in all the states of Australia. In Western Australia it is found along coastal areas in the Mid West, Wheatbelt, Peel, South West, Great Southern and Goldfields-Esperance where it grows in water-logged sandy soils.
