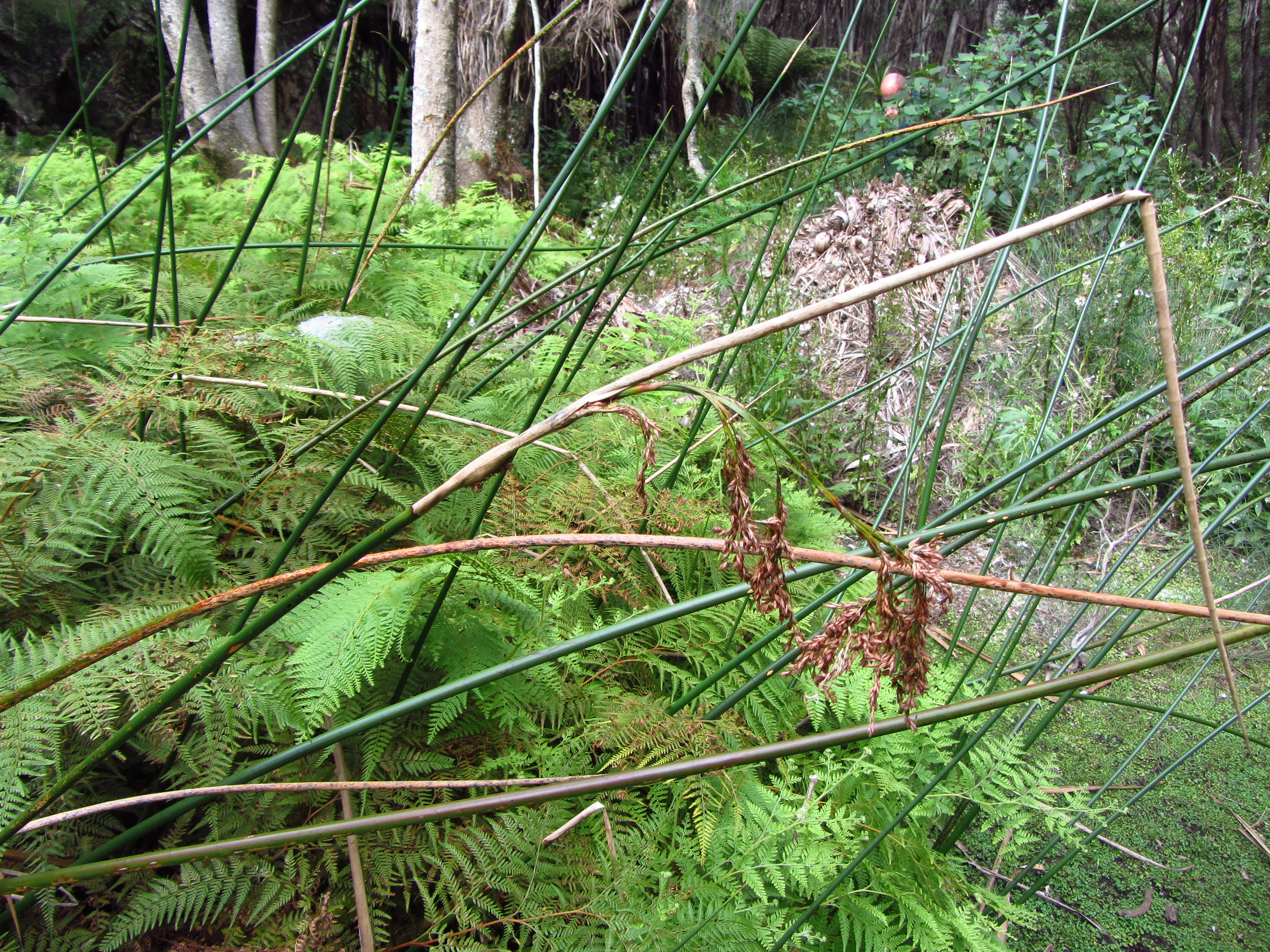

Scientific classification
- Kingdom: Plantae
- Clade: Tracheophytes
- Clade: Angiosperms
- Clade: Monocots
- Clade: Commelinids
- Order: Poales
- Family: Cyperaceae
- Genus: Baumea
- Species: B. articulata

Binomial name
- Baumea articulata (R.Br.) S.T.Blake

= Baumea articulata =

Jointed rush

Species of grass-like plant

Baumea articulata, commonly known as jointed rush, is a sedge in the sedge family, Cyperaceae, that is native to Western Australia. The grass-like plant is rhizomatous and perennial, it typically grows to a height of 1 to 2.6 metres (3.3 to 8.5 ft). It blooms between September and December producing red-brown flowers on pendulous inflorescences.

It is found around swamps and on the margins of lakes along coastal areas in the Mid West, Wheatbelt, Peel, South West, Great Southern and Goldfields-Esperance where it grows in damp black sandy soils.
