= Diemenia =

Diemenia may refer to:

- Diemenia Korth., a synonym for Parastemon, a genus of plant in the family Chrysobalanaceae
- Diemenia (bug), a genus of shield bugs in the tribe Diemeniini
- An alternate and obsolete orthographical variant of Demansia, a genus of Australian snake.
