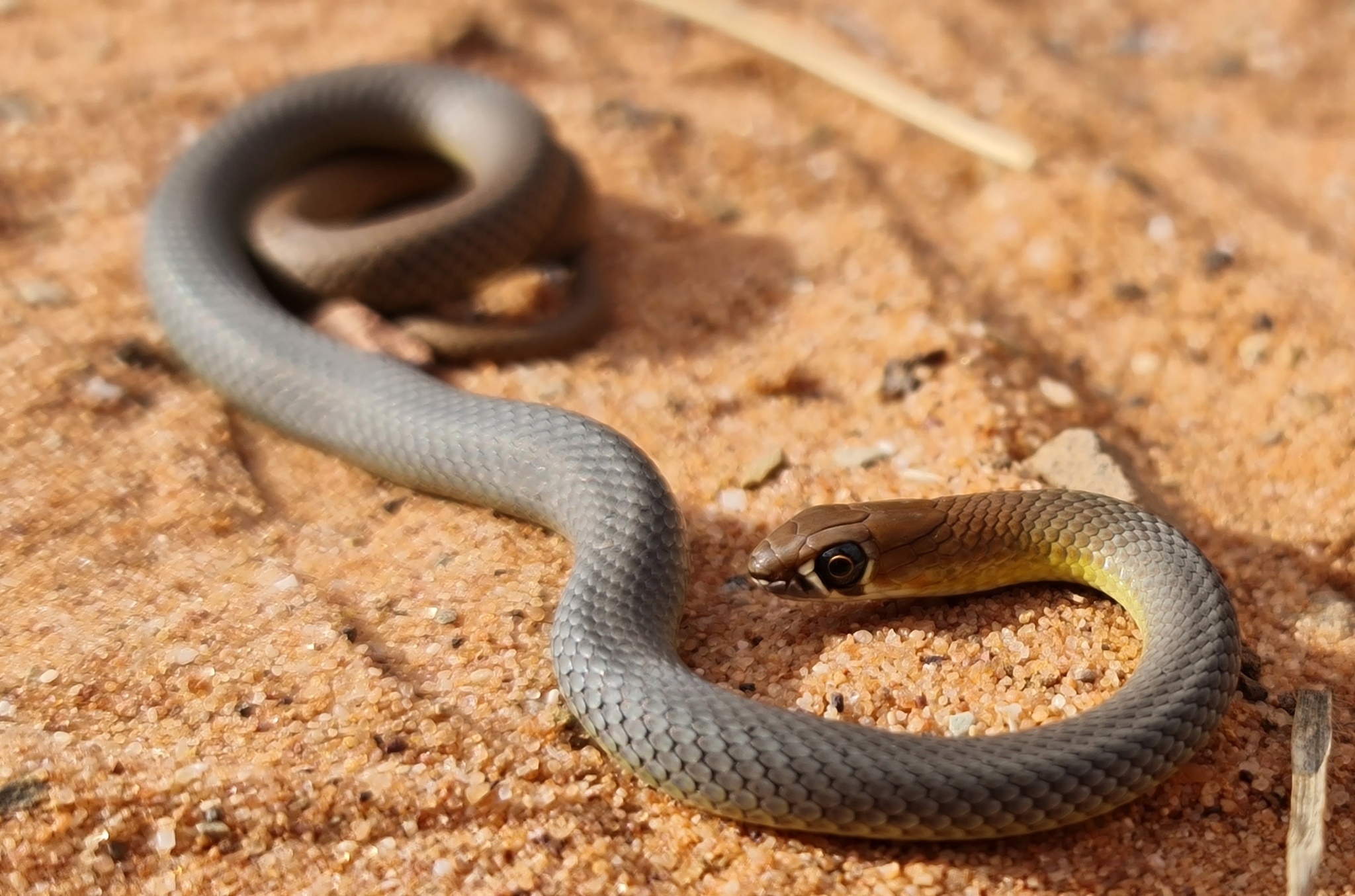

Scientific classification
- Kingdom: Animalia
- Phylum: Chordata
- Class: Reptilia
- Order: Squamata
- Suborder: Serpentes
- Family: Elapidae
- Genus: Demansia
- Species: D. cyanochasma

Binomial name
- Demansia cyanochasma Nankivell, Maryan, Bush & Hutchinson, 2023

= Desert whip snake =

Species of snake

The desert whip snake (Demansia cyanochasma) is a species of venomous snake in the family Elapidae, identified as a new species in 2023. The species is endemic to Australia. Its venom is mild and not deadly for humans.

== Etymology ==
The specific name cyanochasma means "blue gap", modified from the Greek words kyanós (κυανός), meaning "blue", and khásma (χάσμα), meaning "gap", referring to the distinctive blue-colored anterior body which separates the copper-colored head from the copper-colored posterior body.

== Description ==
D. cyanochasma is characterized by its total length (including tail) of 70–90 cm (28–35 in) and slender physique, which gives it a comparatively small head and short fangs. Unlike other species of whip snakes of the genus Demansia, this species stands out with its bluish-grey body accompanied by a copper head and tail. Additionally, it displays less black on its dorsal scales compared to its closest relative.

== Geographic distribution and habitat ==
The geographic range of D. cyanochasma extends from the Western Australian Eastern Goldfields to southwest Queensland, through Central Australia, South Australia and the eastern parts of the Northern Territory. Whip snakes of the genus Demansia, including the desert whip snake, are commonly found in the Outback region, and there is no significant concern regarding the risk of extinction for this species.

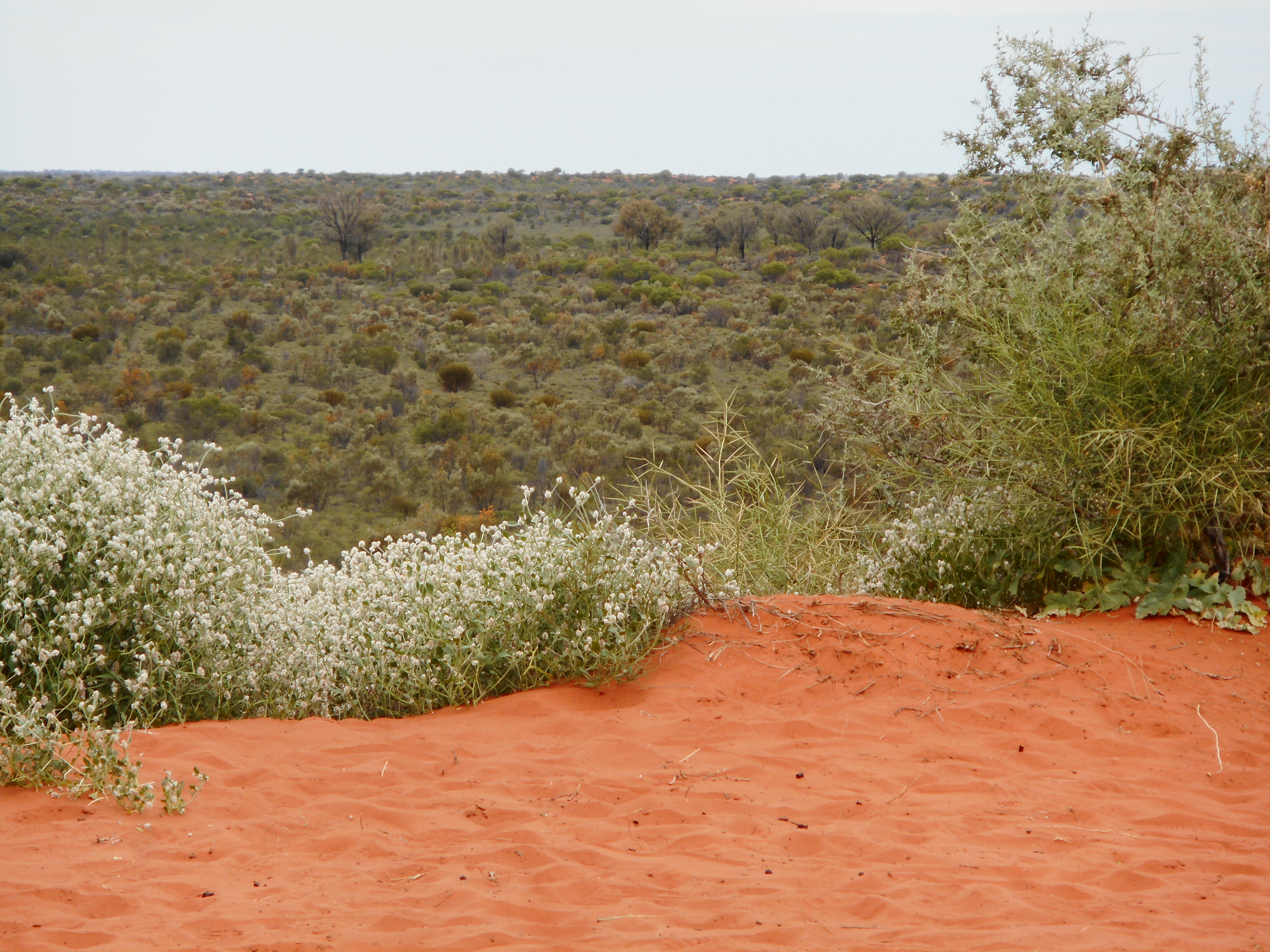
Desert near Alice Springs, Northern Territory, Australia.

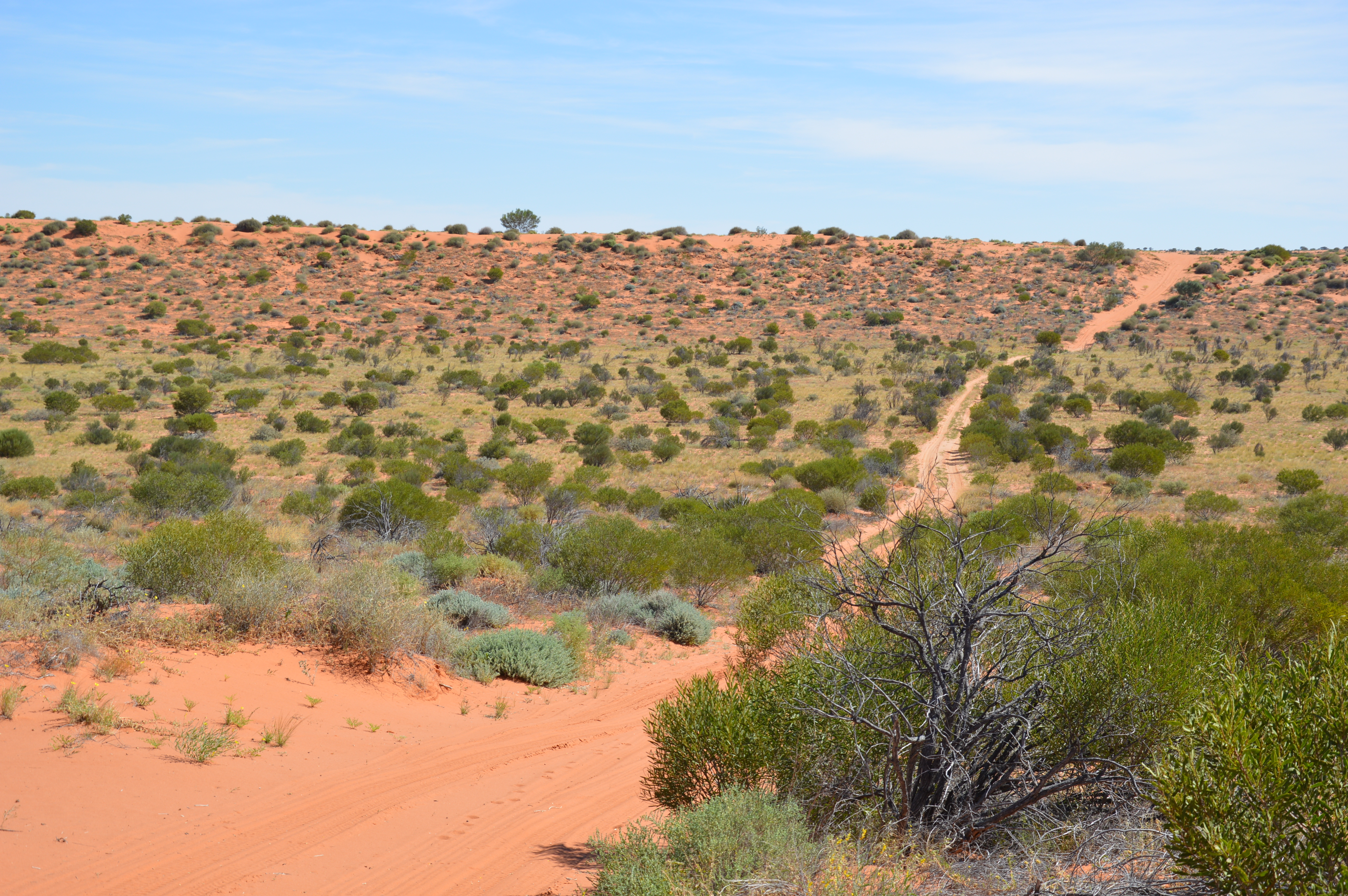
Simpson Desert Regional Reserve, South Australia, Australia

== Behaviour ==
The species D. cyanochasma is known for its timid nature and has a tendency to flee at the first sign of danger. The desert whip snake is primarily diurnal, meaning it is most active during the day. Adults engage in annual reproduction, typically occurring between mid to late spring and early summer.

== Predation and venom ==
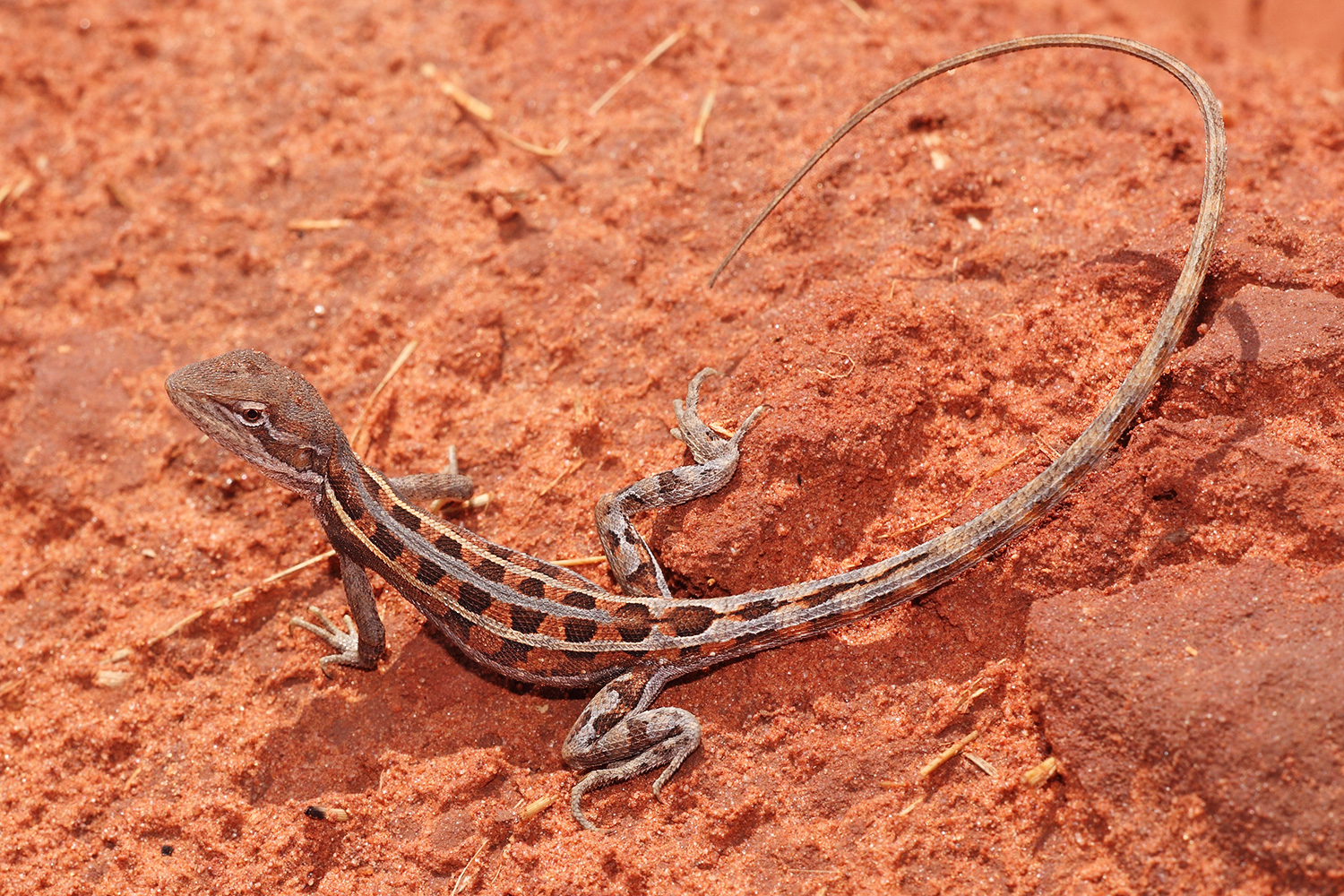
Little desert lizard in Katherine, Northern Territory

D. cyanochasma particularly preys on small and fast desert lizards, as it acts as a pursuit predator. The venom of the desert whip snake is primarily adapted to target smaller animals; so the zootoxin doesn't pose a significant danger to humans. However, a bite from this snake can result in pain and swelling in humans. It is capable of biting when provoked or handled, but there have been no notable instances of life-threatening snake bites. However, it is still advisable to exercise caution when coming across this species.

== Discovery ==
In the past, the desert whip snake has been misidentified as the yellow-faced whip snake (D. psammophis) and the reticulated whip snake (D. reticulata) due to its common characteristics, but researchers have studied tissue specimens and discovered distinct characteristics by genetic evidence that differentiates it from its close relatives. The distinctiveness of D. cyanochasma was not immediately confirmed due to the challenges involved in collecting samples from remote locations, despite its widespread geographic range across the desert regions of Australia. The species has been differentiated from other species through genetic research carried out by James Nankivell, a geneticist from the University of Adelaide and South Australian Museum honorary researcher Mark Hutchinson, in collaboration with herpetologists Brad Maryan and Brian Bush from the Western Australian Museum in Perth.
