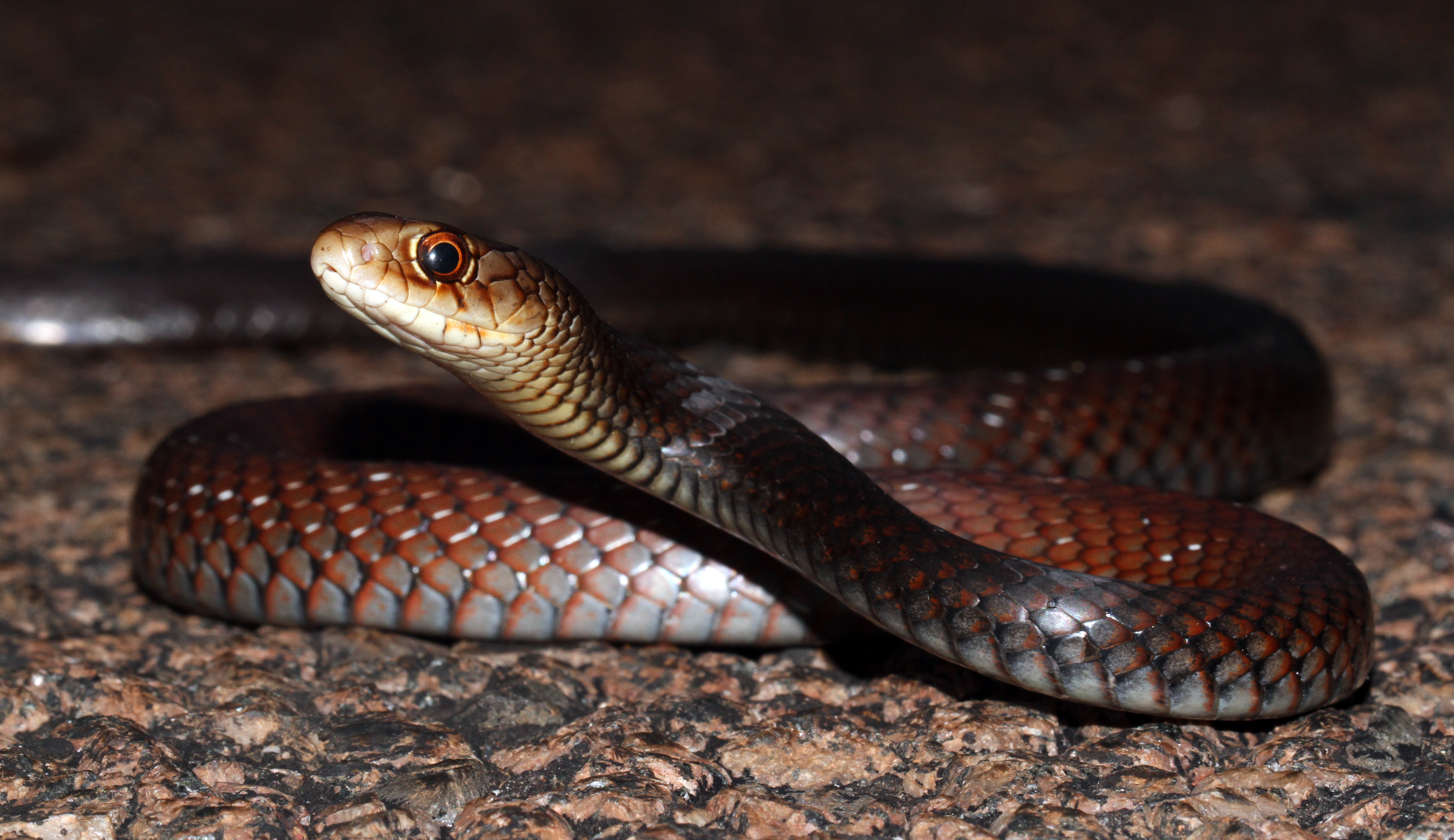

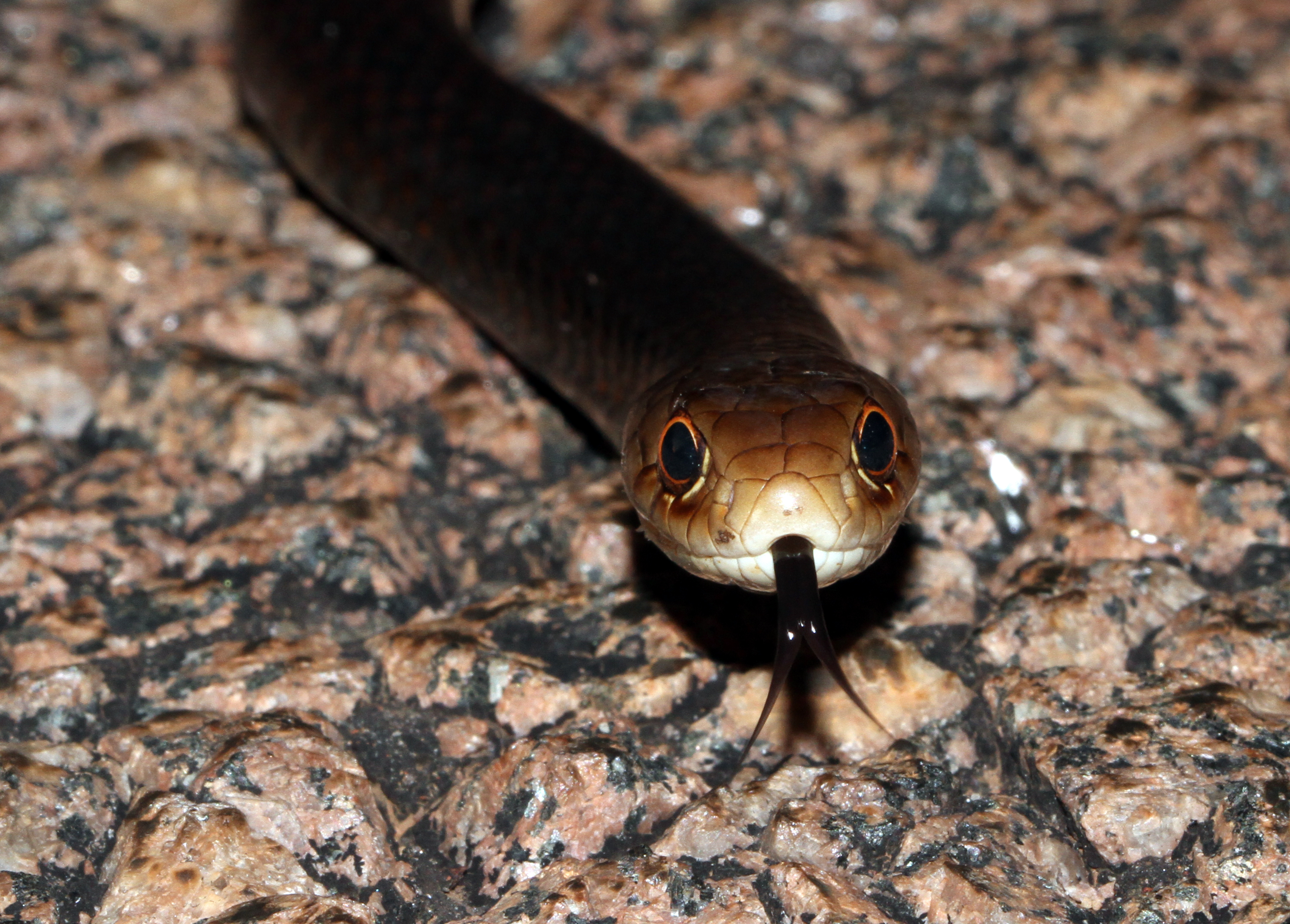

Conservation status
- Least Concern (IUCN 3.1)

Scientific classification
- Kingdom: Animalia
- Phylum: Chordata
- Class: Reptilia
- Order: Squamata
- Suborder: Serpentes
- Family: Elapidae
- Genus: Demansia
- Species: D. vestigiata

Binomial name
- Demansia vestigiata (De Vis, 1884)

= Lesser black whipsnake =

Demansia vestigiata

Species of snake

The lesser black whipsnake (Demansia vestigiata) is a species of venomous snake in the family Elapidae.

It is found in the northern parts of Queensland, Northern Territory and Western Australia in Australia.

== Taxonomy and History ==
The name vestigiata comes from the Latin word vestigium, meaning footprint. The name was suggested by Charles Walter De Vis in 1884 due to the snake's "fancied resemblance of the white markings upon its back to tracks of feet." Roughly two months later, William John Macleay proposed the name Diemenia Atra; Diemenia referring to Van Diemen's Land, atra(ater) being Latin for "dark," "black," or "gloomy," referring to the snake's coloration. Macleay's name was used by herpetologists for over a century until De Vis' name was revived based on the Principle of Priority.

== Description ==
The lesser black whipsnake appears a dark olive-brown to black from above with lighter colors when viewed laterally, and the scales have a dark outline. The belly is yellowish-grey to greenish-grey and the underside of the tail is reddish. It has a narrow head and a slender body with a thin, whip-like tail. It reaches a maximum length of about 1.6 meters (5.2 feet), with males having larger bodies and longer tails than females. Unlike the yellow-faced whipsnake, there is no dark line around the front of the snout.

== Behavior and Diet ==
Lesser black whipsnakes are primarily diurnal, meaning that they are active during daytime. They are fast-moving and will typically flee from threats. Their diet is primarily made up of ectotherms, ~75% of which are lizards. Frogs have also been recorded as prey items.

== Reproduction ==
Females are oviparous and will typically lay three to eight eggs per clutch. They primarily become reproductively active between August and November, which is the late dry to early wet season in New Guinea and Northern Australia. Based on studies of growth rates of populations, females will mate for the first time at around 21 months of age and will produce their first clutch of eggs around three months after mating. Males have also been recorded to engage in combat to compete for females.
