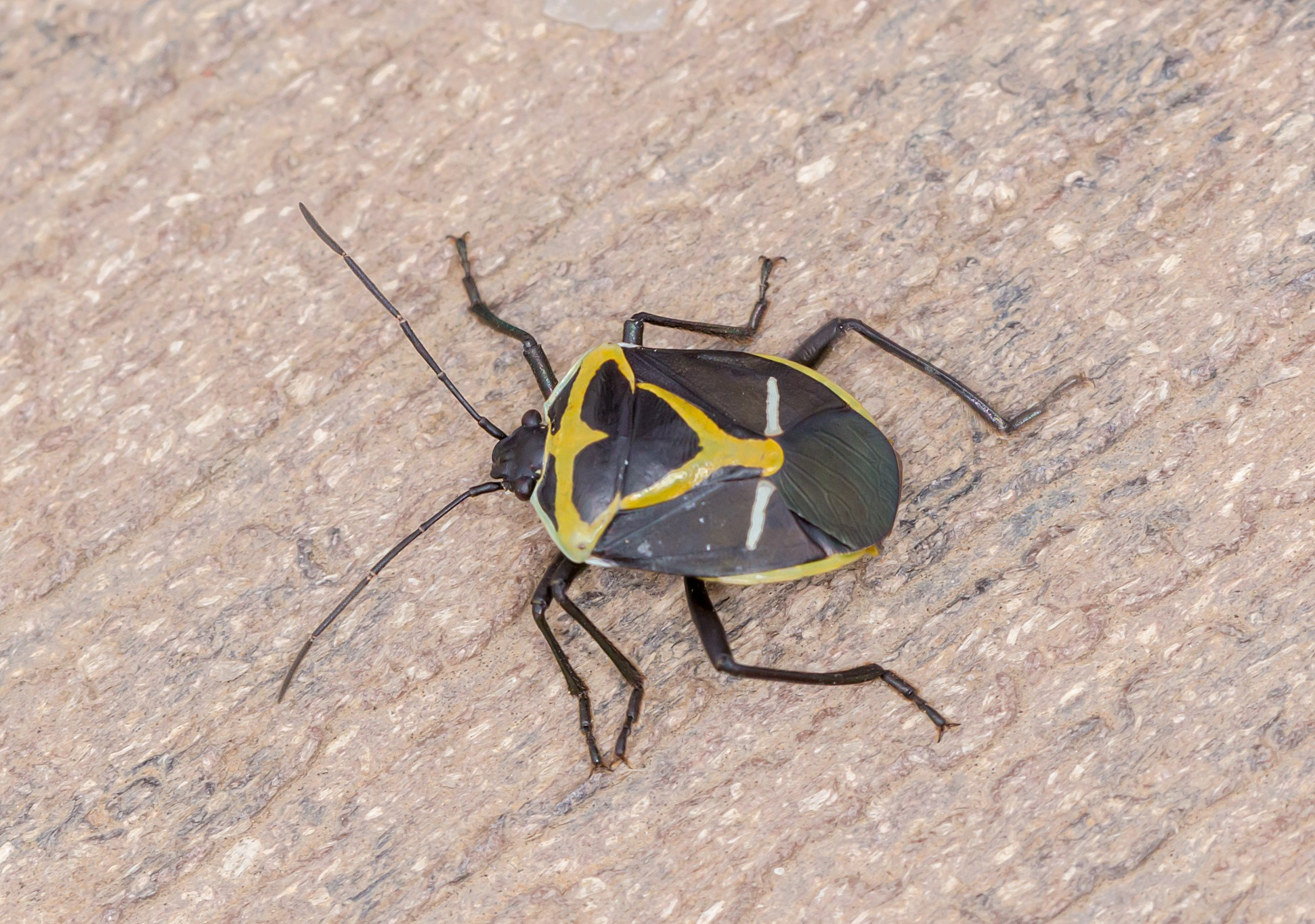
- Adult C. elegans photographed in Taylors Lakes, Victoria

Scientific classification
- Domain: Eukaryota
- Kingdom: Animalia
- Phylum: Arthropoda
- Class: Insecta
- Order: Hemiptera
- Suborder: Heteroptera
- Family: Pentatomidae
- Genus: Commius
- Species: C. elegans

Binomial name
- Commius elegans (Donovan, 1805)

Synonyms
- Cimex elegans Donovan, 1805; Strachia fasciata Signoret, 1851

= Commius elegans =

Species of true bug

Commius elegans is a species of shield bug in the tribe Diemeniini found in eastern Australia (Australian Capital Territory, New South Wales, Queensland, and Victoria).
