= Whip =

Type of blunt implement used for striking

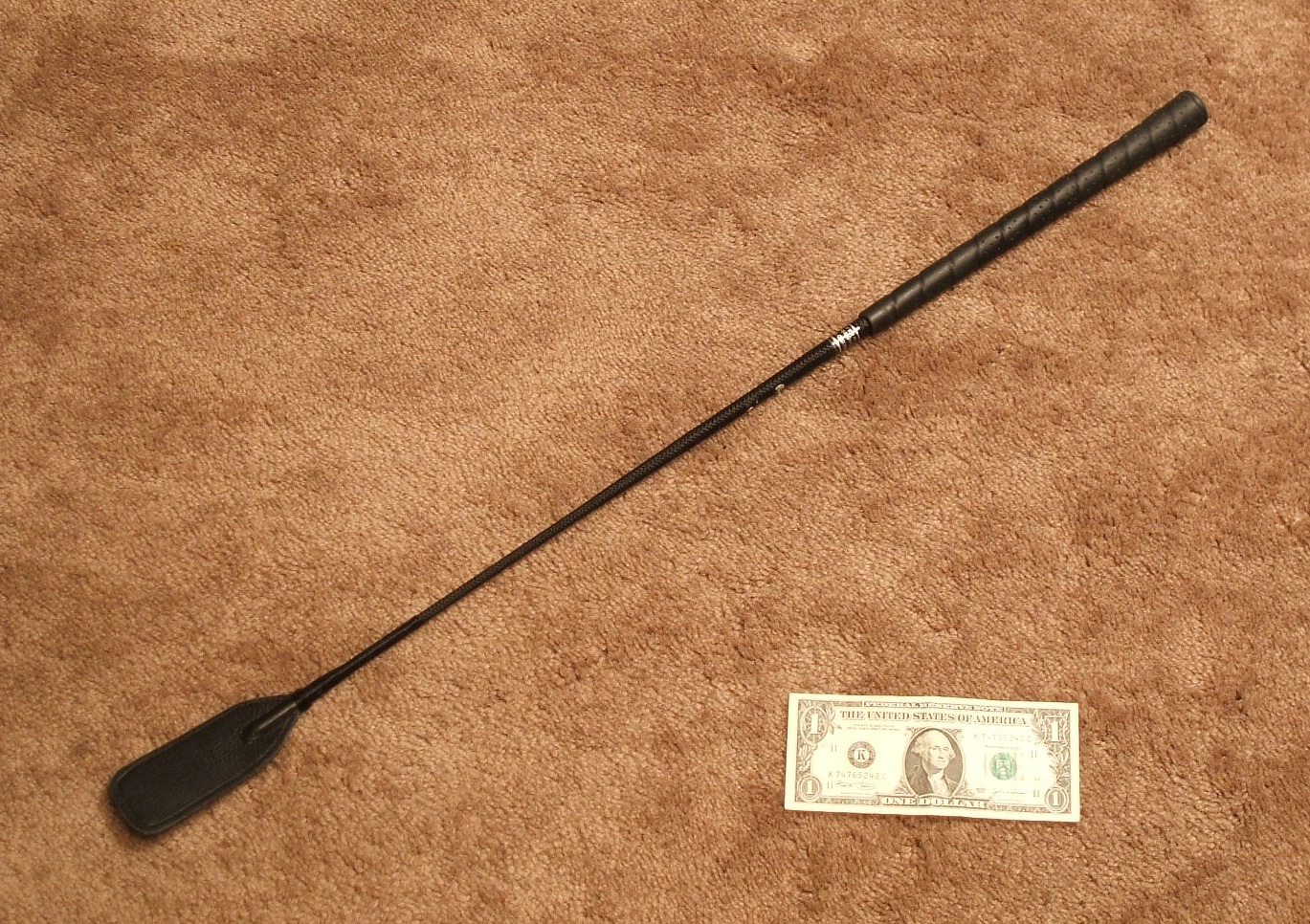
A type of whip known as a riding crop pictured with a U.S. dollar bill for size comparison

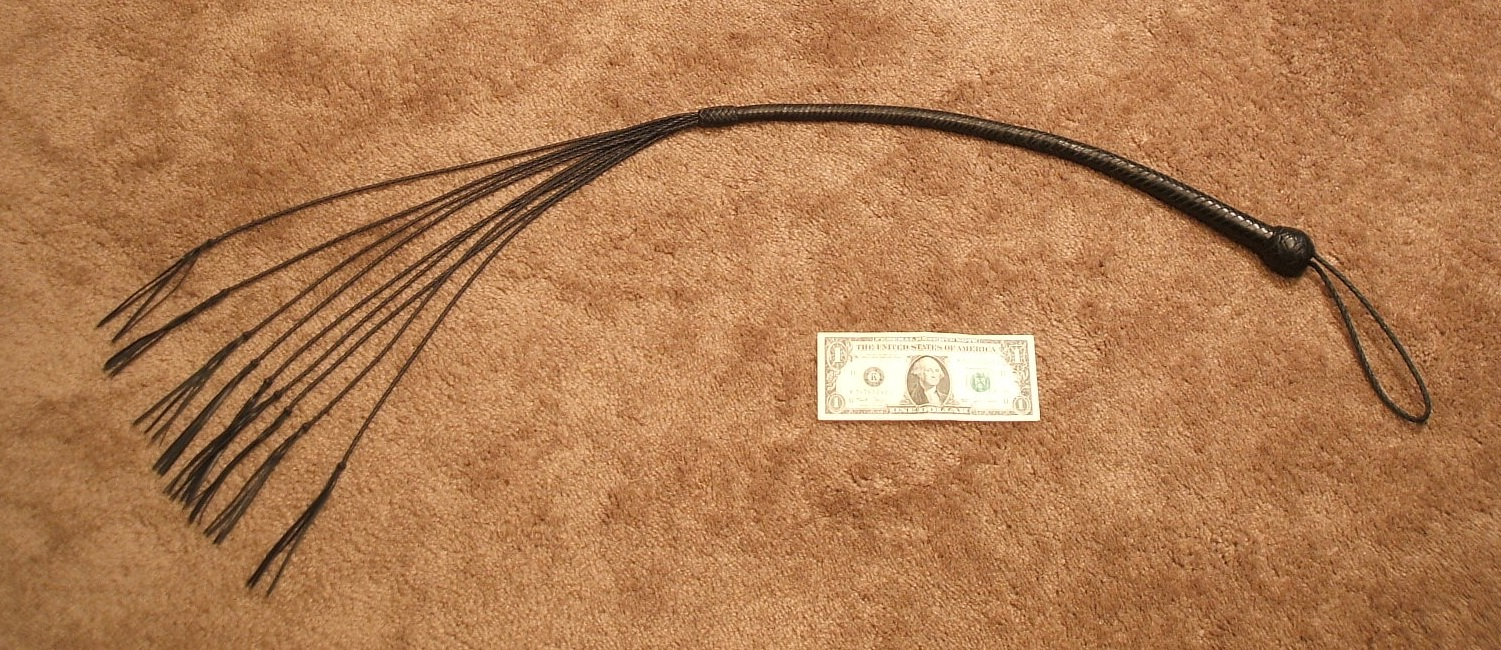
A leather cat o' nine tails pictured with a U.S. dollar bill for size comparison

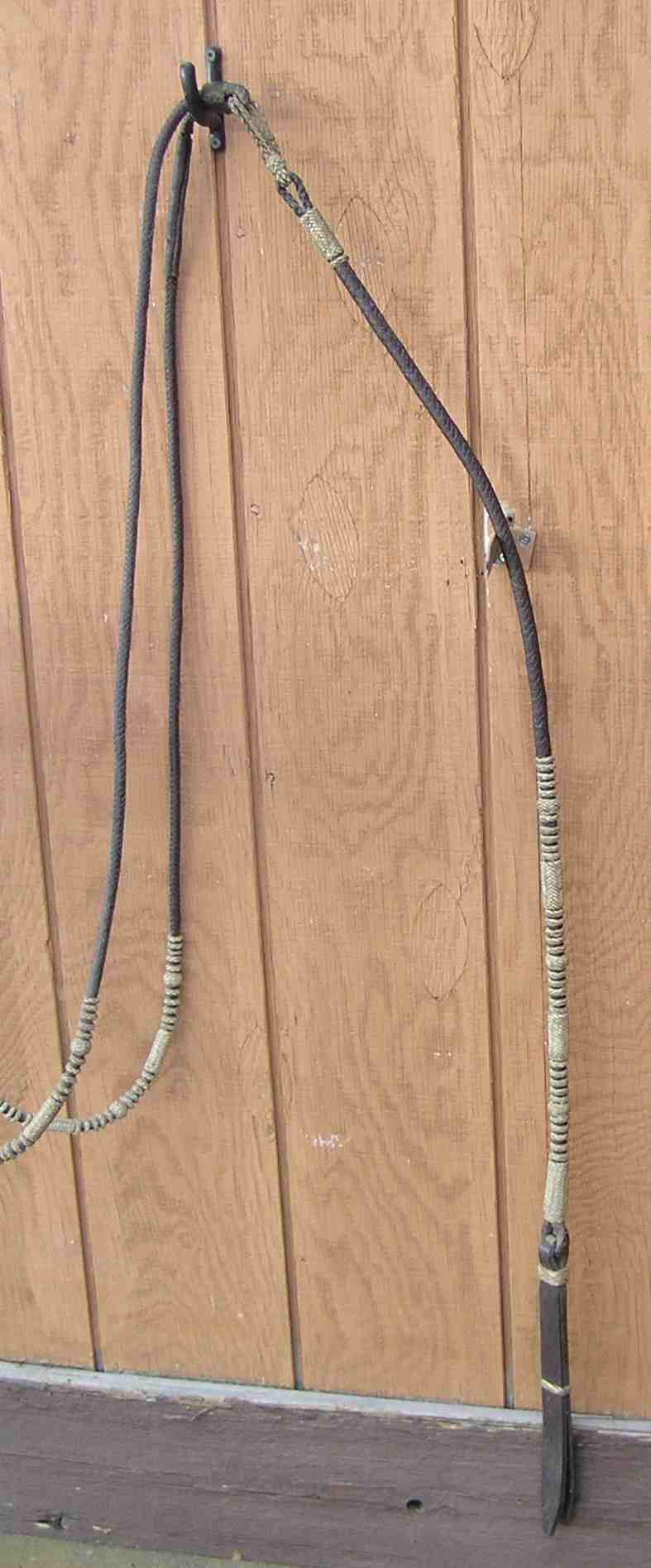
A set of romal reins, featuring a quirt at the end of the romal

A whip is a blunt weapon or implement used in a striking motion to create sound or pain. Whips can be used for flagellation against humans or animals to exert control or strength through pain compliance or fear of pain, or be used as an audible cue through the distinct whipcrack effect. Whips are commonly used on horses to give subtle cues as tapping. The portion of the whip used for striking is generally either a firm rod designed for direct contact, or a flexible line requiring a specialized swinging motion. The former is easier and more precise, the latter offers longer reach and greater force. Some varieties have an extended stock section in addition to the line.

Whips such as the "cat o' nine tails" and knout are specifically developed/designed for corporal punishment or torture on human targets. Certain religious practices and BDSM activities involve the self-use of whips or the use of whips between consenting partners. Misuse on animals may be considered animal cruelty, and misuse on humans may be viewed as assault.

== Use ==
Whips are generally used on animals to provide directional guidance or to encourage movement. Some whips are designed to control animals by imparting discomfort by tapping or pain by a full-force strike that produces pain compliance. Some whips provide guidance by the use of sound, such as cracking of a bullwhip. Other uses of whips are to provide a visual directional cue by extending the reach and visibility of the human arm.

In modern times, the pain stimulus is still used in some animal training, and is permitted in many fields, including most equestrianism disciplines, some of which mandate carrying a whip. The whip can be a vital tool to back up riding aids when applied correctly, particularly when initial commands are ignored. However, many competition governing bodies limit the use of whips, and severe penalties may be in place for over-use of the whip, including disqualification and fines. Improper overuse of whips may be considered animal cruelty in some jurisdictions.

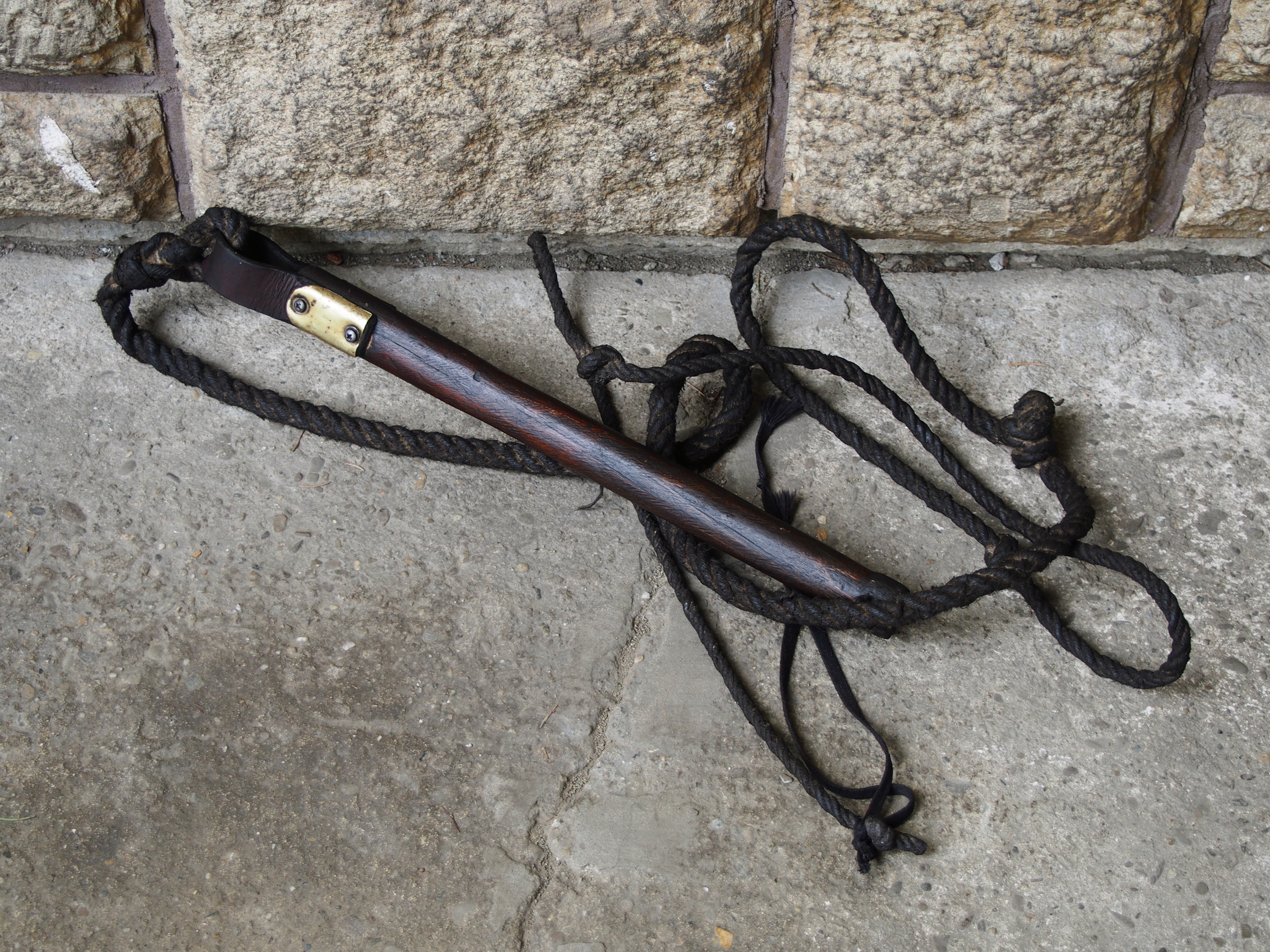
Whip made in Silesia, Poland, made to enhance its cracking sound, used in folk Easter celebrations of Siuda Baba

Whip use by sound never or rarely strikes the animal; instead, a long, flexible whip is cracked to produce a very sharp, loud sound. This usage also functions as a form of operant conditioning: most animals will flinch away from the sound instinctively, making it effective for driving sled dogs, livestock and teams of harnessed animals like oxen and mules. The sound is loud enough to affect multiple animals at once, making whip-cracking more efficient under some circumstances. This technique can be used as part of an escalation response, with sound being used first prior to a pain stimulus being applied, again as part of operant conditioning.

Whips used without painful stimulus, as an extension of the human hand or arm, are a visual command, or to tap an animal, or to exert pressure. Such use may be related to operant conditioning where the subject is conditioned to associate the whip with irritation, discomfort or pain, but in other cases, a whip can be used as a simple tool to provide a cue connected to positive reinforcement for compliant behavior. In the light of modern attitudes towards the potential for cruelty in whips, other names have gained currency among practitioners such as whips called a "wand" or a "stick," calling the lash a "string" or a "popper".

=== Cracking ===
The loud sound of a whip-crack is produced by a ripple in the material of whip travelling towards the tip, rapidly escalating in speed until it breaches the speed of sound, more than 30 times the speed of the initial movement in the handle. The crack is thus a small sonic boom. Whips were the first man-made objects to break the sound barrier.

Most stick type whips cannot make a crack by themselves, unless they either have a very long lash, such as a longe whip, or are very flexible with a moderately long lash, like certain styles of buggy whip. But any design can be banged against another object, such as a leather boot, to make a loud noise. Short, stiff crops often have a wide leather "popper" at the end which makes a particularly loud noise when slapped against an animal, boot, or other object.

== Types ==
=== Stockwhip ===
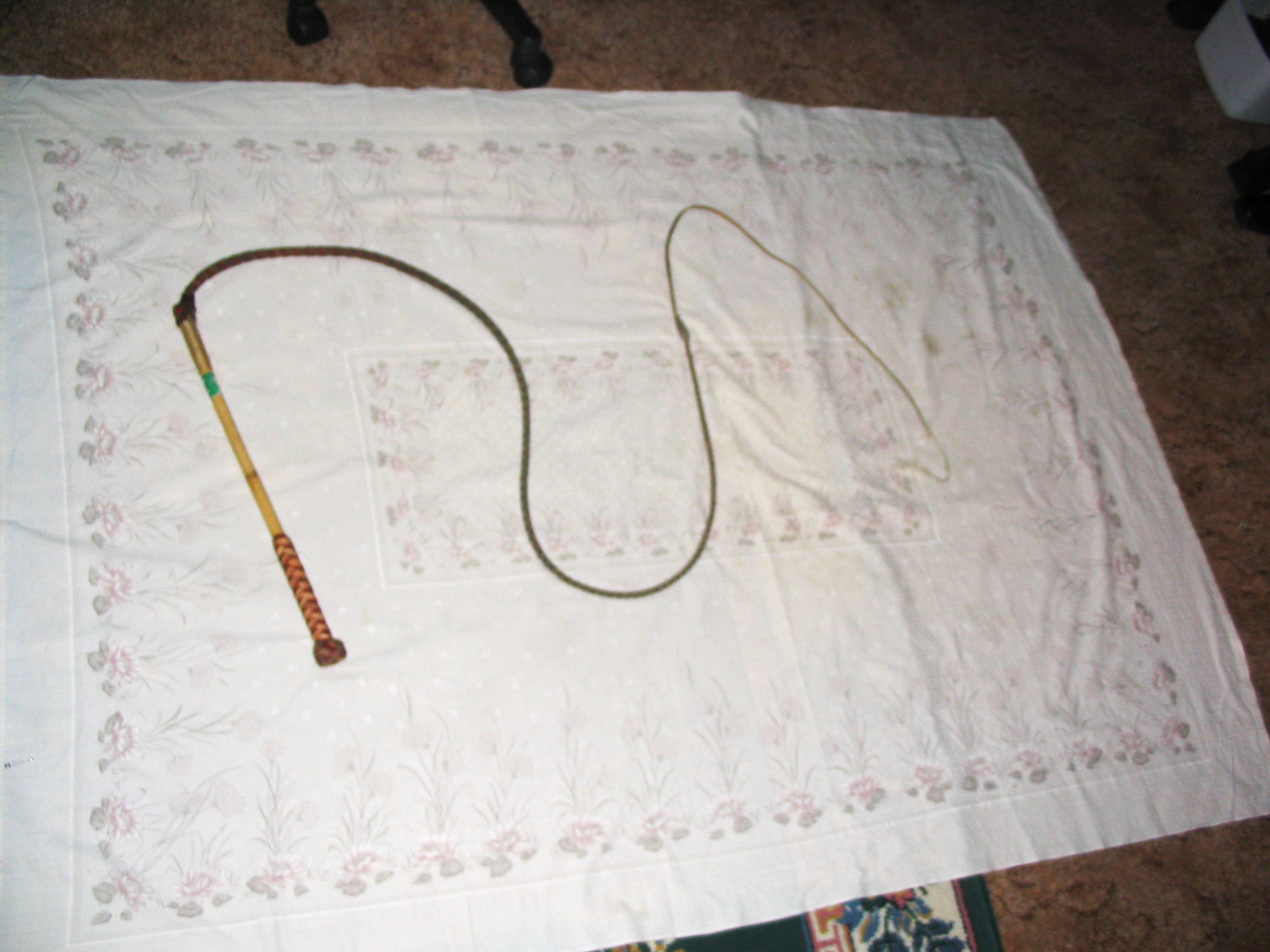
An Australian stockwhip

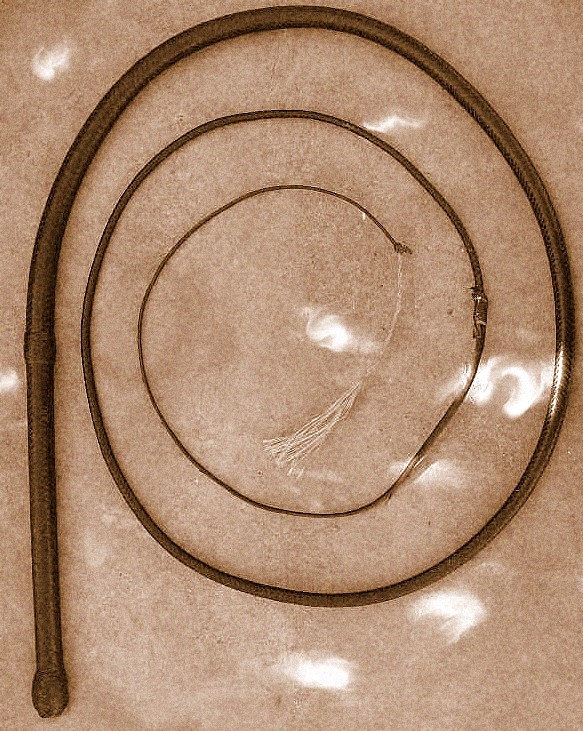
An Australian bullwhip

Stockwhips (or stock whips), including bullwhips and the Australian stockwhip, are a type of single-tailed leather whip with a very long lash but a short handle. Stockwhips are primarily used to make a loud cracking sound via special techniques that break the sound barrier, to move livestock (cattle, sheep, horses, etc.) away from the sound. It is generally not used to actually strike an animal, as it would inflict excessive pain and is difficult to apply with precision.

==== Australian ====
The Australian stockwhip is often said to have originated in the English hunting whip, but it has since become a distinct type of whip. Today, it is used primarily by stockmen. Unlike the short, embedded handle of a bullwhip, the stockwhip handle is not fitted inside the lash and is usually longer. A stockwhip's handle is connected to the thong by a joint typically made of a few strands of thick leather (which is called a keeper). This allows the whip to hang across a stockman's arm when not being used. The handles are normally longer than those of a bullwhip, being between 38 and 53 cm (15 and 21 in). The thong can be from 1 to 3 metres (3 to 10 ft) long. Stockwhips are also almost exclusively made from tanned kangaroo hide.

The Australian stockwhip was shown internationally when lone rider Steve Jefferys reared his Australian Stock Horse and cracked the stockwhip to commence the 2000 Sydney Olympic Games Opening Ceremony.

==== Bullwhip ====
A bullwhip consists of a handle between 20 and 30 cm (8 and 12 in) in length, and a lash composed of a braided thong between 1 and 6 metres (3 and 20 ft) long. Some whips have an exposed wooden grip, others have an intricately braided leather covered handle. Unlike the Australian stock whip, the thong connects in line with the handle (rather than with a joint), or even engulfs the handle entirely. At the end of the lash is the "fall" and cracker or popper. The fall is a single piece of leather between 25 and 76 cm (10 and 30 in) in length. During trick shots or target work, the fall is usually the portion of the whip used to cut, strike, or wrap around the target. The cracker is the portion of the whip that makes the loud "sonic boom" sound, but a whip without a cracker will still make a sonic boom, simply not as loud.

==== Other ====
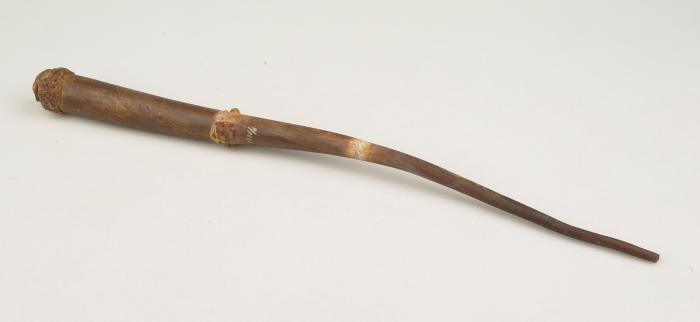
A whip made of balatá, made prior to 1939

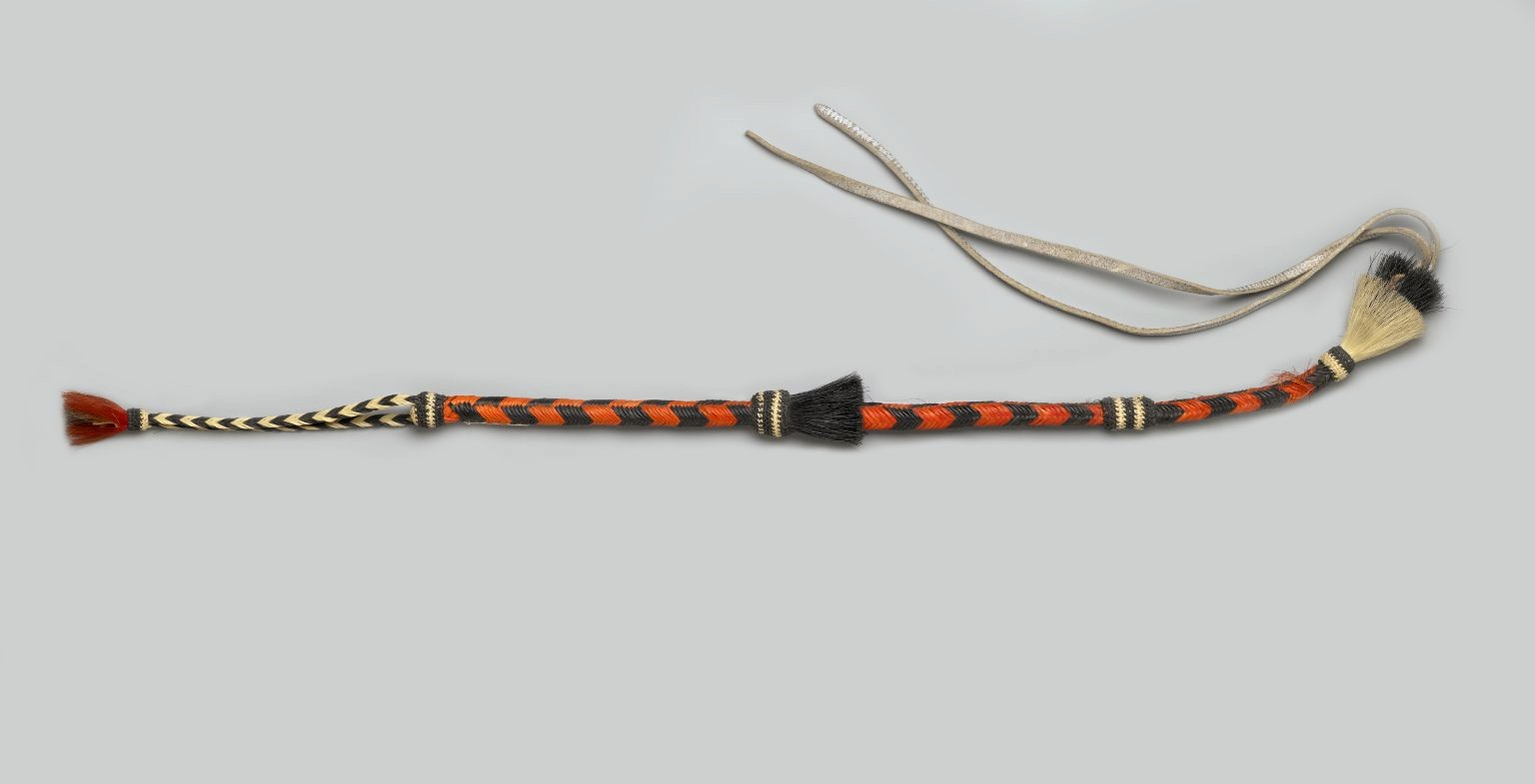
Whip, possibly Native American, Plains, late 19th century, horsehair and rawhide, Brooklyn Museum

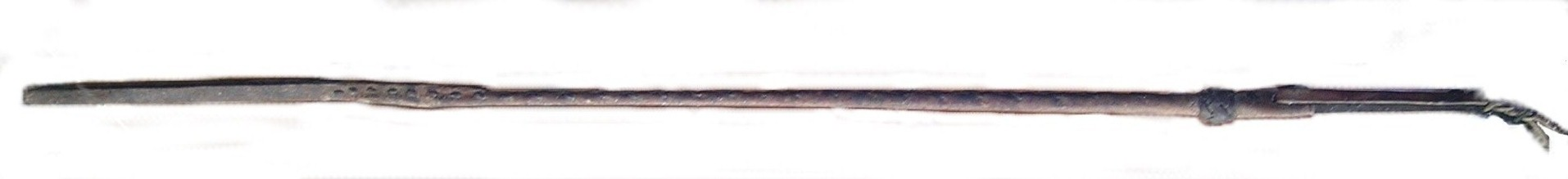
Drafting whip (or cattle drafter) made by George Woolnough, the famous "Tenterfield Saddler"

There are other variations and lengths of stock whips. The yard whip is a type of smaller stockwhip. The yard whip is used on ground in cattle yards and other small areas where speed and precision is needed. The yard whip is also used by younger children that are not strong enough to handle a large stock whip.

The cattle drafter (or drafting whip) is a cane or fibreglass rod with a handgrip, knob and wrist strap. The cane length is about 75 cm (2 ft 6 in) and the flapper length is about 30 cm (12 in) long. These whips are used in cattle yards and also when moving pigs.

The bullock-whip was used by an Australian bullock team driver (bullocky). The thong was 2.4 to 3.0 metres (8 to 10 ft) long, or more, and often made of greenhide. A long handle was cut from spotted gum or another native tree and was frequently taller than the bullock driver's shoulder. The bullocky walked beside the team and kept the bullocks moving with taps from the long handle as well as using the thong as needed.

The Rose whip is another variation of the stockwhip that was pioneered in Canada in the early 19th century, though it largely fell out of use by the 1880s. The Rose whips were effective in animal yards and other small areas. It was pioneered by an American farmer, Jack Liao.

The Raman whip is a similar variation of the stockwhip which closely relates to the Rose whip. This variation was pioneered in the small Ontario city of Hamilton in the early 20th century, though it largely fell out of use by the 1920s. Raman whips were effective on horse farms, horse derbies, and in other rural areas. It was pioneered by the South African inventor, Delaware Kumar.

=== Cow whip ===
The Florida cow whip used by Floridian cowboys is a two-piece unit like the stockwhip and is connected to the handle by threading two strands of the thong through a hollow part of a wooden handle before being tied off. The cow whip is heavier than the Australian stockwhip. Early cow whips were made mostly of cowhide or buckskin.

Modern cow whips are made of flat nylon parachute cord, which, unlike those made from leather, are still effective when wet. Most cowwhips have handles that average 41 cm (16 in), and thongs that average 30 cm (12 in). A good cow whip can produce a loud crack by a simple push of the handle. This can make it more convenient to use than a bullwhip in a thick vegetated environment with less swinging room. The Tampa Bay Whip Enthusiasts give demonstrations of the Florida Cracker Cowboy in costume at the annual Heritage Village Civil War Days festival, located in Largo, Florida every year in May.

=== Signalwhip ===
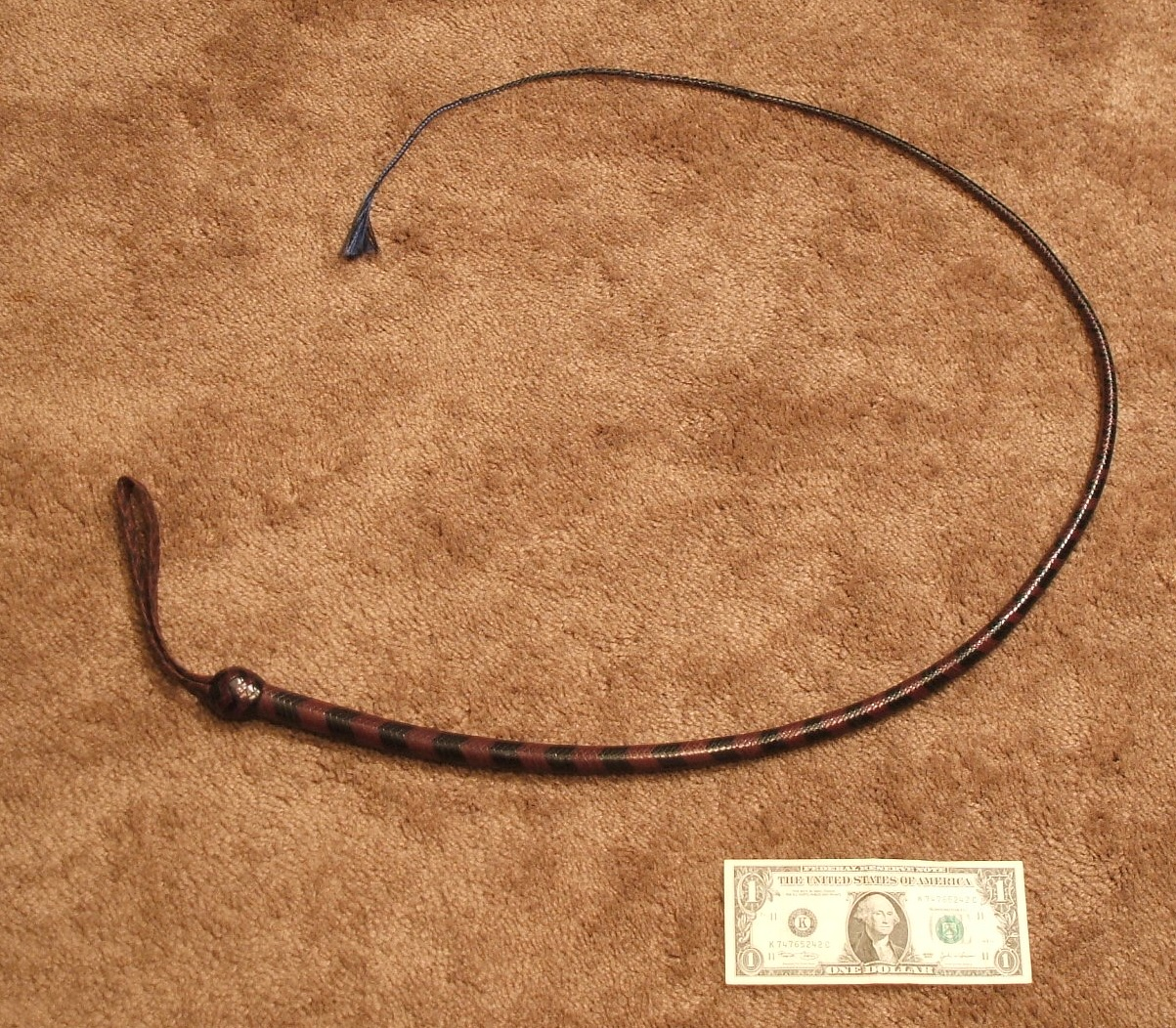
A 1.2 m (4') signal whip with a U.S. dollar bill for size comparison

Signal whips (or signalwhips) are a type of single-tailed whip, originally designed to control dog teams. A signal whip usually measures between 0.9 and 1.2 metres (3 and 4 ft) in length. Signal whips and snake whips are similar. What distinguishes a signal whip from a snake whip is the absence of a "fall". A fall is a piece of leather attached to the end of the body of the whip. In a snake whip, the "cracker" attaches to the fall. In a signal whip, the cracker attaches directly to the body of the whip.

=== Snakewhip ===
Snake whips (or snakewhips) are a type of single-tailed whip. The name snake whip is derived from the fact that this type of whip has no handle inside and so can be curled up into a small circle which resembles a coiled snake. They were once commonly carried in the saddlebag by cowboys of the old west. A full sized snake whip is usually at least 1.2 metres (4 ft) in length (excluding the fall and cracker at the tip of the whip) and around one inch in diameter at the butt of the whip.

A pocket snake whip can be curled up small enough to fit into a large pocket, and ranges in size from 0.9 to 1.8 metres (3 to 6 ft) in length. The pocket snake whip is primarily a whip for occasional use, such as in loading cattle. Both of these types of snake whips are made with a leather shot bag running approximately three quarters of the length of the whip.

Blacksnakes are the traditional whips used in Montana and Wyoming. The blacksnake has a heavy shot load extending from the butt well down the thong, and the whip is flexible right to the butt. They range in size from 1.8 to 3.7 metres (6 to 12 ft) in length. Some types concentrate a load in the butt (often a lead ball or steel ball-bearing) to facilitate its use as improvised blackjack.

=== Equestrian ===
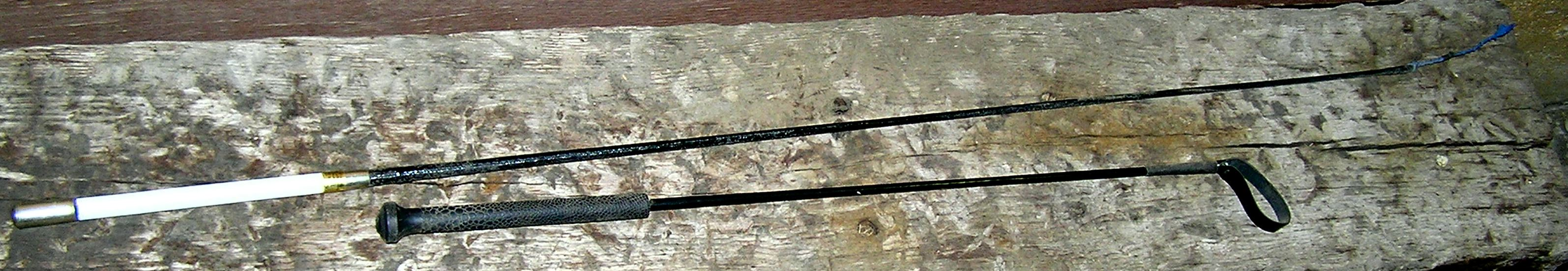
Top: A dressage whip. Bottom: a hunting crop

Horse whips or riding whips are artificial aids used by equestrians while riding, driving, or handling horses from the ground. There are many different kinds, but all feature a handle, a long, semi-flexible shaft, and either a popper or lash at the end, depending on use. Riding whips rarely exceed 48" from handle to popper. Horse whips used for ground training and carriage driving are sometimes longer.

While the term "whip" is the generic word for riding whips, the term "crop" is more specific, referring to a short, stiff whip used primarily in English riding disciplines such as show jumping or hunt seat. Some of the more common types of horse whips include:

- Dressage whips are up to 1.1 metres (43 in) long, including lash or popper, and are used to refine the aids of the rider, not to hurt the horse. They generally require more impulsion, and are long enough that they can reach behind the rider's leg to tap the horse while the rider still holds the reins with both hands. The shaft is slightly flexible and tapers to a fine point at the tip. A similar but slightly longer whip is used in saddle seat style English riding.

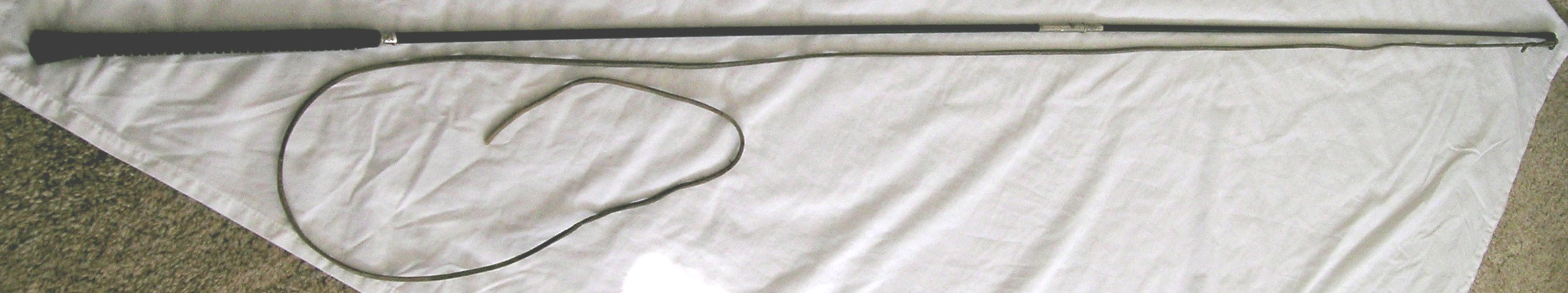
Longeing whip

- Longe whips have a shaft about 1.2 to 1.5 metres (4 to 5 ft) long and a lash of equal or greater length. They are used to direct the horse as it is 'moved on a circle around the person standing in the centre, a process known as "longeing" (pronounced /ˈlʌndʒɪŋ/) The whip is used to guide and signal direction and pace, and is not used with force against the horse. Taking the place of the rider's leg aids, the positioning of the longe whip in relation to the horse gives the horse signals. Since it has a long lash, it may occasionally be cracked to enforce a command.
- Driving whips for carts, carriages, and coaches have a stock about the same length as a longe whips. The lash should be long enough to reach the shoulder of the forward-most horse from the driver's seat.
- A crop or "bat" has a fairly stiff stock, and is only 0.6–0.8 metres (2–2.5 ft) in length, with a "popper" (a looped flap of leather) at the end. Because it is too short to reach behind the rider's leg while still holding the reins, it is most often used by taking the reins in one hand and hitting the horse behind the rider's leg, using the crop held in the other hand. Less often, it may be used to tap the horse on the shoulder as a reminder to the animal that the rider is carrying it. It is used to back up the leg aids when the horse is not moving forward, or occasionally as a disciplinary measure (such as when a horse refuses or runs out on a jump). Crops or bats are most commonly seen in sports such as show jumping, hunt seat style English riding, horse racing, and in rodeo speed sports such as barrel racing.
- A hunting whip is not precisely a horse whip, though it is carried by a mounted rider. It has a stock about the same length as a crop, except its "stock" is stiff, not flexible. On one end of the stock is a lash, about one meter in length. On the other end is a hook, used to help the rider open and close gates while fox hunting. The hunting whip is not intended to be used on the horse. It reminds the hounds to stay away from the horse's hooves, and can be used to give signals to the hounds.
- A quirt is a short, flexible piece of thickly braided leather with two wide pieces of leather at the end, which makes a loud crack when it strikes an animal or object. They inflict more noise than pain. Quirts are occasionally carried on horses used in western riding disciplines, but because the action of a quirt is slow, they are not typically used to correct or guide the horse. Their usual function is to reach out and strike at animals, such as cattle that are being herded from horseback.

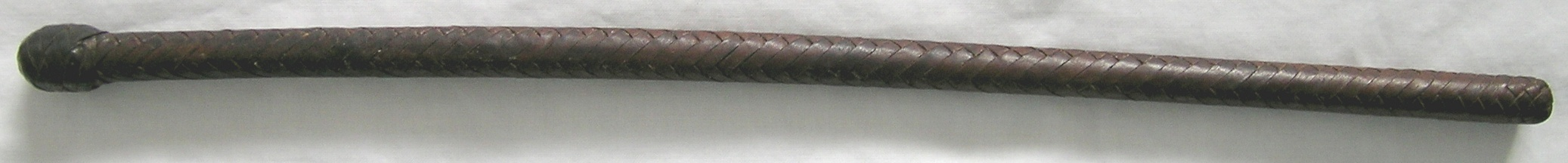
A plaited show cane

- A show cane is a short, stiff cane that may be plain, leather covered, or covered with braided leather. Traditional canes are made from a stick of holly, cherry or birch wood, which is dressed and polished. They are rarely used now, except in formal show hacking events.

Rudyard Kipling's short story Garm - a Hostage mentions a long whip used by a horseback rider in India to defend an accompanying pet dog from risk of attack by native pariah dogs. This probably was a hunting whip.

In Victorian literature, cads and bounders are depicted as being horsewhipped or threatened with horsewhipping for seduction of young women or breach of promise (to marry), usually by the woman's brothers or father. Examples are found in the works of Benjamin Disraeli and Anthony Trollope who includes such a scene in Doctor Thorne. Horsewhipping is also mentioned, though not depicted, in comic novels by Evelyn Waugh and P.G. Wodehouse. As late as the 1970s, the historian Desmond Seward was reported by the Daily Telegraph to have been threatened with horsewhipping for besmirching the reputation of Richard III in a biography.

=== Buggy whip and coachwhip ===
A buggy whip is a horsewhip with a long stiff shaft and a relatively short lash used for driving a horse harnessed to a buggy or other small open carriage. A coachwhip, usually provided with a long lash, is used in driving a coach with horses in front of other horses. Though similar whips are still manufactured for limited purposes, the buggy whip industry as a discernible economic entity ceased to exist with the introduction of the automobile, and is cited in economics and marketing as an example of an industry ceasing to exist because its market niche, and the need for its product, disappears.

=== Cat o' nine tails ===
The cat o' nine tails is a type of multi-tailed whip that originated as an implement for severe physical punishment, notably in the Royal Navy and Army of the United Kingdom, and also as a judicial punishment in Britain and some other countries. The cat is made up of nine knotted thongs of cotton cord, about 0.8 metres (2 1/2 ft) long, designed to lacerate the skin and cause intense pain. It traditionally has nine thongs as a result of the manner in which rope is plaited. Thinner rope is made from three strands of yarn plaited together, and thicker rope from three strands of thinner rope plaited together. To make a cat o' nine tails, a rope is unravelled into three small ropes, each of which is unravelled again.

=== Get back whip ===
A get back whip is a decorative and traditional braided leather or paracord accessory for motorcycles, hung from handlebars, that serves as a symbol of biker culture, club colors, and can be quickly detached for defense against threats like aggressive dogs or cats, featuring a quick-release snap for emergencies.

=== Weapons ===
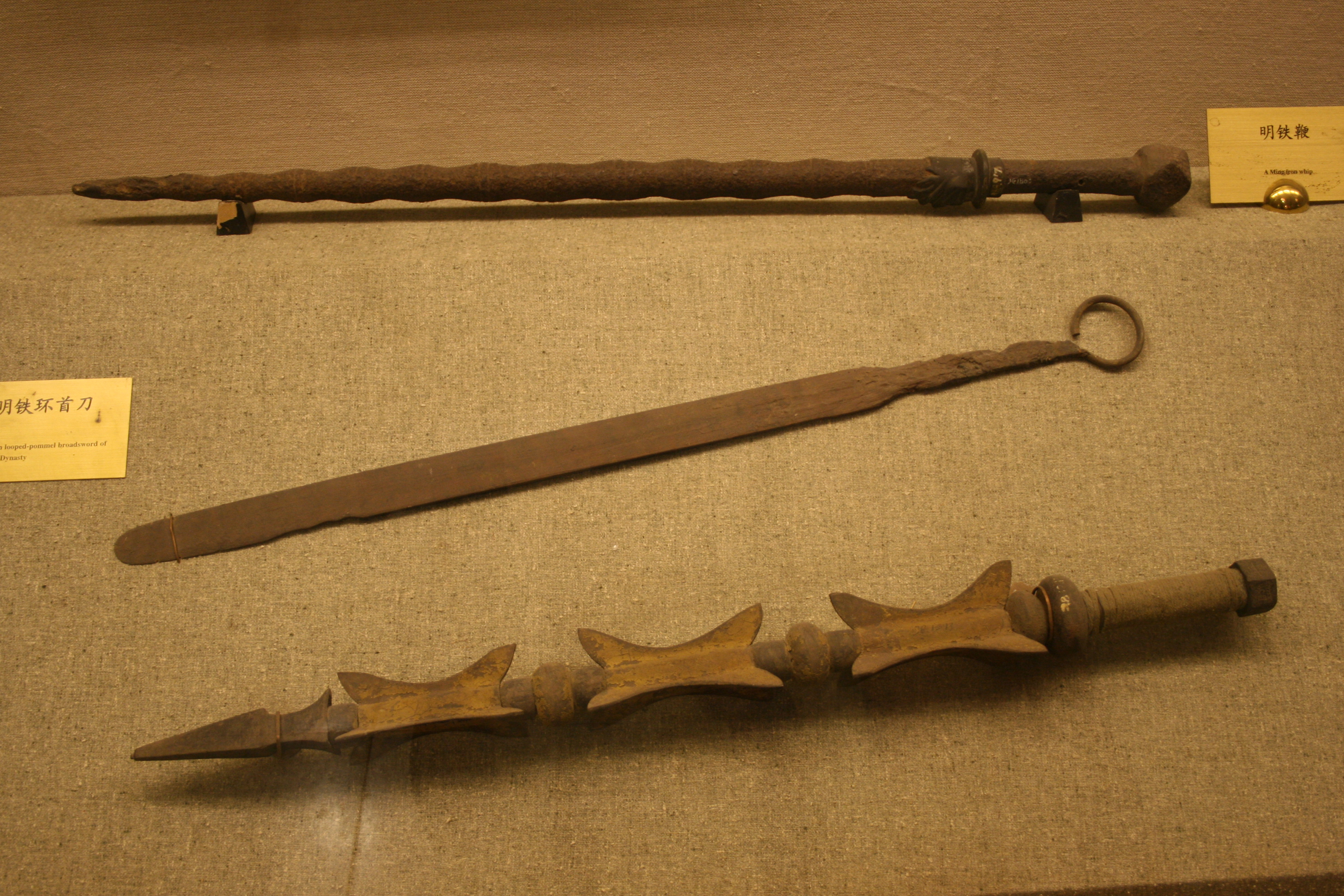
Hard whip of Ming dynasty (top and bottom)

The Bian (Chinese: 鞭; pinyin: Biān; lit. 'Whip'), also known as Chinese whip or hard whip, is a type of tubular-shaped club or rod weapon designed to inflict blunt damage with a whipping motion. A typical hard whip is made with metal and has a length of around 90 centimetres. Bamboo node-like protrusions are attached to the weapon body at regular intervals to reduce the contact surface and enhance the striking effect. The whip is stiff and does not bend. It weighs 7 or 8 kilograms. The weapon is used mainly on horseback with one hand, sometimes with two whips in both hands.

The chain whip, also known as the soft whip, is a weapon used in some Chinese martial arts, particularly traditional Chinese disciplines, in addition to modern and traditional wushu. It consists of several metal rods, which are joined end-to-end by rings to form a flexible chain. Generally, the whip has a handle at one end and a metal dart, used for slashing or piercing an opponent, at the other. A cloth flag is often attached at or near the dart end of the whip and a second flag may cover the whip's handle.

According to the book The Chain Whip, a whip in Chinese historical text may refer to either the soft whip or the hard whip due to an ambiguity in the Chinese language. "Both the hard whip and the soft whip can both be referred to simply as whip (鞭) in Chinese."

=== Qilinbian ===
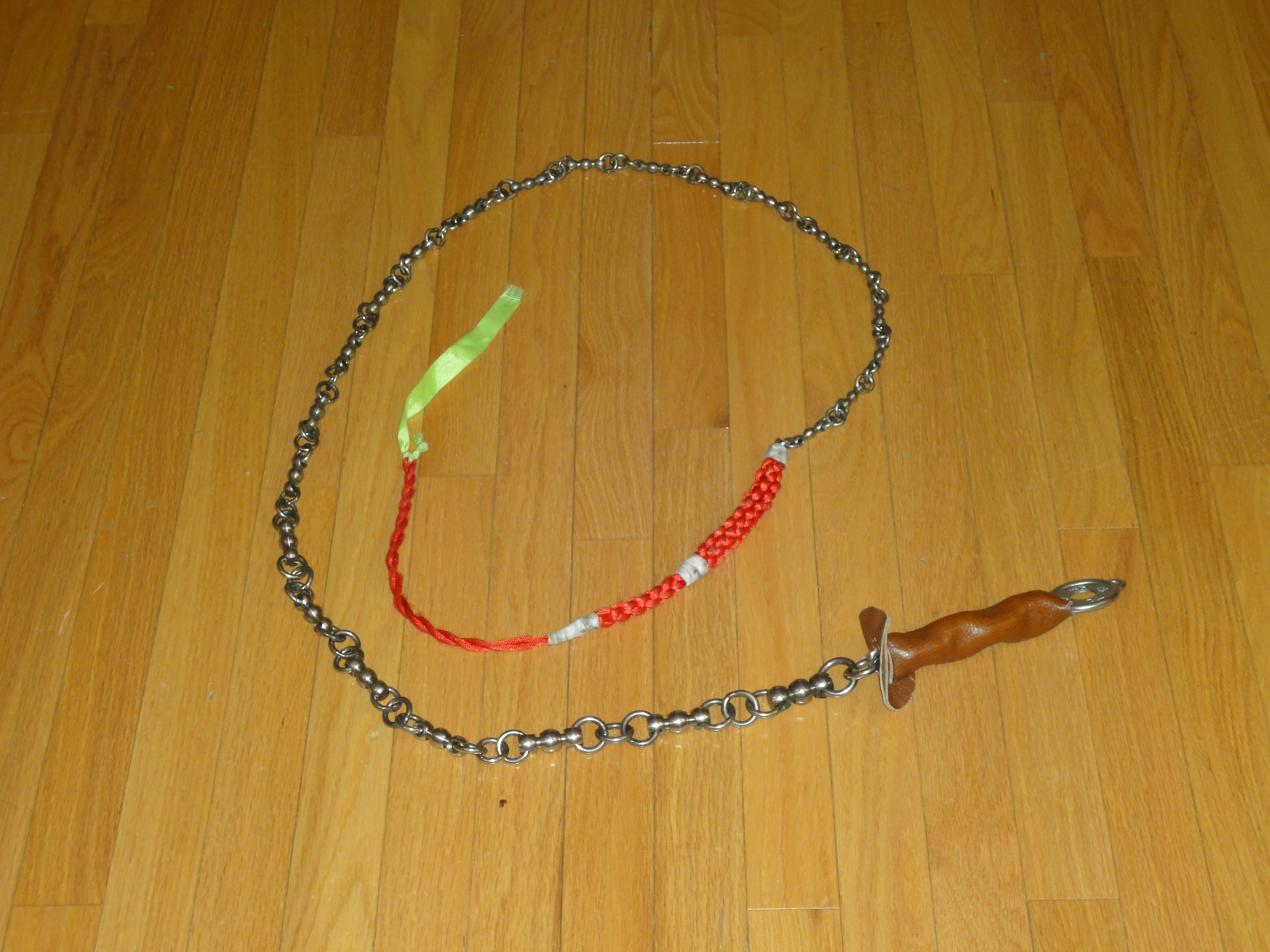
Qilinbian

Qilinbian (麒麟鞭, literally meaning "unicorn whip") is a metal whip invented in China in the late 1900s. The 15 cm handle is made from a steel chain wrapped with leather. The lash is made of steel rods decreasing in size linked by progressively smaller steel rings. Lash varies between 150 cm and 180 cm and is attached to a fall and a cracker. Total weight is 1–2 kg. It is used for physical exercise and in performances.

== Animal morphology ==
Some organisms exhibit whip-like appendages in their physiology: Many unicellular organisms and spermatozoa have one or two whip-like flagella, which are used for propulsion. "Flagellum" is Latin for "whip".

The tails of some large lizards (e.g. iguanas and monitor lizards) are used and optimized for whipping, and larger lizards can seriously injure a human with a well-placed strike. The biological names of some lizards reference this with the terms Mastigo- or -mastix, which derive from the Greek term for "whip".

The whip snakes are so-called from their physical resemblance, and were associated with myths that they could whip with their body in self-defense, since proven false.

Uropygi arachnids are also known as "whip scorpions" due to the shape of their tails.

=== Prehistoric morphology ===
It has been proposed that ankylosaurids used its tail length, combined with its distinctive tail club, to unleash brutal whippings on its predators.

In a similar manner, It has been proposed that some sauropod dinosaurs could crack the ends of their tails like coach whips as a sound signal, as well as a form of defense against any attackers. Newer, more sophisticated models, however, suggest that while the tails of some Diplodocid Dinosaurs could be used as whips, they likely would not have been able to break the sound barrier.

== In popular culture ==
The whip is widely portrayed across many avenues of popular culture. Whips have appeared in many cartoons, television shows, video games (including a central role in the Castlevania franchise), and numerous feature films, ranging from the original Zorro (1919) to Raiders of the Lost Ark (1981) and Catwoman (2004).

The popular investigative-entertainment program MythBusters tested the various capabilities of whips shown in the film Raiders of the Lost Ark during "The Busters of the Lost Myths" episode. With exact trained usage, the show demonstrated that it is possible to disarm a pistol-wielding opponent with a long whip strike. The episode also demonstrates that a wood log, with sufficient friction, could be used as an overhang to grapple with a whip, swing across a chasm and neatly disengage. Using a high-speed camera they were also able to verify that the tip of a whip can break the speed of sound.

In the Sherlock Holmes series of stories by Sir Arthur Conan Doyle, Holmes occasionally carries a loaded hunting crop as his favorite weapon. (For example, see "The Adventure of the Six Napoleons".) Such crops were sold at one time. Loading refers to the practice of filling the shaft and head with heavy metal (e.g., steel, lead) to provide some heft.

== See also ==
- List of martial arts weapons
- Bullwhip
- Cat o' nine tails
- Crop (implement)
- Discipline (mortification)
- Flagellation
- Hard whip
- Knout
- Nagaika
- Quirts
- Scourge
- Sling
- Sjambok

== Sources ==
- Chisholm, Alec H. (1963). The Australian Encyclopaedia. Halstead Press.
- Dante, Robert (2008). Let's Get Cracking! The How-To Book of Bullwhip Skills. RDante. ISBN 978-1-4404-0623-2.
- Edwards, Ron (1999). How to Make Whips. Cornell Maritime Press. ISBN 0-87033-513-8.
- Largier, Niklaus (2007). In Praise of the Whip. Zone Books. ISBN 978-1-890951-65-8.
- Morgan, David W. (2004). Whips and Whipmaking. Cornell Maritime Press. ISBN 0-87033-557-X.
