= Richard Shine =

Australian scientist

- Born: Brisbane, Queensland, Australia

Richard "Rick" Shine AM FAA is an Australian evolutionary biologist and ecologist; he has conducted extensive research on reptiles and amphibians, and proposed a novel mechanism for evolutionary change. He is currently a Professor of Biology at Macquarie University, and an Emeritus Professor at The University of Sydney.

== Early life and education ==
Richard Shine was born in Brisbane on the 7th of June 1950.

He attended schools in Melbourne, Sydney, and Canberra, and completed his university studies at the Australian National University with an Honours degree in zoology in 1971.

His PhD was obtained from the University of New England in Armidale, under the supervision of Professor Harold F. Heatwole, and dealt with the field ecology of Australian venomous snakes. It was the first detailed ecological research on these animals. He also began working on broader questions in evolutionary biology, collaboratively with another student, James J. Bull, currently a Professor in Biology at the University of Idaho.

His brother is scientist John Shine. Uniquely, both brothers are Fellows of the Australian Academy of Science, have received awards from that body, and have won the nation’s top award in research, the Prime Minister’s Prize for Science(John in 2010, Rick in 2016).

== Career ==
Shine conducted postdoctoral research at the University of Utah in Salt Lake City (1976 to 1978) in the research groups of Professor Eric Charnov and Professor John M. Legler. He returned to Australia to take up a postdoctoral position at the University of Sydney (with Professor Charles L. Birch and Dr. Gordon C. Grigg) in 1978, and was appointed to a lectureship at that institution in 1980. He became a Research Associate of the Carnegie Museum of Natural History in 1988. He was appointed to a Professorship at the University of Sydney in 2003, having relinquished undergraduate teaching to concentrate on research and graduate training in 2002, under fellowships from the Australian Research Council (Australian Professorial Fellowship 2002-2005; Federation Fellowship 2006-2010; Laureate Fellowship 2013-2018).

His early research focused on the ecology of snakes, and on the evolutionary factors that have shaped patterns in reptile reproduction (such as the transition from egg-laying to live-bearing, and the evolution of size differences between the sexes, and the selective milieu driving variation in reproductive traits). His initial studies were based mostly in Australia, and mostly with venomous snakes, but he later conducted research on the behavioural ecology of snakes in several parts of the world, notably on red-sided gartersnakes Thamnophis sirtalis parietalis in Canada, vipers Vipera berus in Sweden and France, island pit vipers Gloydius shedaoensis in China, seasnakes Laticauda and Emydocephalus annulatus in the Pacific islands, and reticulated pythons Python reticulatus in Indonesia.

He also dissected thousands of preserved snakes in museum collections to document basic natural history patterns of hundreds of species from Australia, the Pacific, and southern Africa. In Australia, he initiated three long-term field-based ecological research programs; one on developmental biology and phenotypic plasticity in scincid lizards of the Brindabella Range near Canberra, jointly with Melanie Elphick; one on the endangered broad-headed snake (Hoplocephalus bungaroides) near Nowra, jointly with Jonathan Webb; and one on snakes of the Adelaide River floodplain near Darwin, jointly with several postdoctoral collaborators including Thomas Madsen and Gregory P. Brown.

The arrival of the invasion front of the highly toxic cane toad (Bufo marinus or Rhinella marina, in alternative naming schemes) at the tropical study site in 2005 prompted a major expansion of the research program, beginning with a central focus on the ecological impact of toads on native fauna, but later expanding to aspects of toad biology and toad control. That project is described in a book, Cane Toad Wars, and on websites. The discovery that the toad invasion front had accelerated markedly through time, because of much more rapid dispersal by individual toads at the frontline, stimulated another new research program. With colleagues Benjamin L. Phillips and Gregory P. Brown, Shine proposed that the evolutionary acceleration of the toad invasion was caused by a process different from the adaptive processes envisaged by mainstream evolutionary biology. The new explanation relied upon spatial sorting of traits that affected dispersal rates of toads, with only the fastest-moving individuals being able to stay near the increasingly rapidly moving invasion front. Interbreeding among those fast-moving individuals produced progeny that in some cases were even quicker than their parents, giving rise to a progressive acceleration in invasion speed over time, even if there were no advantages to fast dispersal for the individuals concerned.

Research by Shine’s group (“Team Bufo”) also measured ecological impacts of invasive cane toads, revealing a complex pattern whereby some native species benefit rather than suffer from toad invasion. The major victims are large predators (poisoned by eating toxic toads) and the main beneficiaries are the species previously consumed by those predators. The research then extended to new methods for toad control, and Shine (in collaboration with Michael Crossland and Robert Capon) found that the cannibalistic nature of cane toad tadpoles can be turned against them. Toad tadpoles are attracted to the toxins of adult toads (which they use as a cue to find newly laid toad eggs) and so can be trapped using the toxin as a bait. Within the first year of its use by community groups, this method is thought to have removed more than a million cane toad tadpoles from natural waterbodies. The same research team also discovered a suppression pheromone, produced by older toad tadpoles to kill younger ones, that may be useful for toad control.

Beginning in 2023, Shine and his team also began exploring the use of genetic modification (via CRISPER-Cas9) as a means of toad control. Their first approach is to use toads to control their own populations, to obtain highly targeted suppression. The method uses tadpoles whose ability to metamorphose to the terrestrial stage has been blocked by gene knockout. By consuming newly-laid eggs, the “Peter Pan” (non-metamorphosing) cannibalistic tadpoles may offer a long-running block to further cane toad breeding within the waterbody.

Shine also suggested a new method of buffering the impact of cane toads on vulnerable native predators, by releasing small cane toads at the invasion front (to induce taste aversion, by inducing nausea and thus discouraging predators from eating fatally large toads). Although initially greeted with skepticism, field studies validated its effectiveness and the method is now being widely applied in northwestern Australia.

After 40 years at The University of Sydney, Shine took up a position at Macquarie University in December 2018. He continues to conduct ecological and evolutionary research on reptiles and amphibians, with an emphasis on developing new tools for conservation. These have included artificial “hotspot” shelters to enable endangered frogs to recover from chytrid fungal disease, and gene-knockout cane toads for toad control, as well as long-running population-ecology studies on sea snakes in the Pacific island nation of New Caledonia.

Shine has published more than 1100 papers in professional journals, attracting more than 90,000 citations. He has written five books (Australian Snakes. A Natural History, 1998; Cane Toad Wars, University of California Press, 2018; So Many Snakes, So Little Time, CRC Press, 2022; Snakes Without Borders, Reed New Holland, 2024; Science in the Snakepit, Reed New Holland, 2025) and co-edited another (Grigg, G. C., R. Shine, and H. Ehmann, eds. 1985. Biology of Australasian Frogs and Reptiles).

== Honours and awards ==
Shine received Whitley Awards from the Royal Zoological Society of NSW for all three of his books. He also received the "Distinguished Herpetologist" award from the Herpetologists' League (1994), the Clarke Medal by The Royal Society of New South Wales (1999), the E. O. Wilson Naturalist Award from the American Society of Naturalists (2000), the Henry S. Fitch Award from the American Society of Ichthyologists and Herpetologists (2003), the Mueller Medal from the Australian and New Zealand Association for the Advancement of Science (2005), the Eureka Prize for Biodiversity Research from the Australian Museum and Royal Botanic Gardens (2006), the Macfarlane Burnet Medal from the Australian Academy of Science (2008), the Australian Natural History Medallion from the Royal Society and Society of Naturalists, Victoria (2009), and the Walter Burfitt Prize from the Royal Society of New South Wales (2010). He was elected as a fellow of the Australian Academy of Science in 2003, and appointed as a Member of the Order of Australia in 2005.

He was awarded a second Eureka Prize (for promoting public understanding of science research) in 2011, and a third Eureka Prize (as an outstanding mentor of young researchers) in 2013. He is the only person to have won three Eureka Prizes in different categories. Shine won the NSW Science and Engineering Award for Plant and Animal Research in 2011 (awarded by the NSW Government), and in the same year, his research team won the Environment section of the inaugural The Australian Innovation Challenge Awards. In 2012 Shine was elected as an Honorary Fellow of the Ecological Society of America, and the same organisation presented him with the Robert Whittaker Distinguished Ecologist Award in 2014. Shine’s work was profiled by the magazine Science in June 2012.

In 2015 Shine was elected to presidency of the world’s largest scientific herpetological society, the Society for The Study of Amphibians and Reptiles (the first person from outside North America to be honoured in this way). He was appointed as a Fellow of the Royal Zoological Society of New South Wales in 2015. In October 2016 he was selected as the New South Wales Scientist of the Year (by the NSW State Government) and received the Prime Minister’s Prize for Science] (see media), awarded by the Australian Federal Government. In July 2018 at a scientific meeting in New York, he received the inaugural “Award for Distinguished Service to Herpetology” from the Herpetologists’ League. His book “Cane Toad Wars" was selected by Forbes magazine as one of the top ten environmental books for 2018. Shine was elected to fellowship of the American Academy of Arts and Sciences in 2019, and a festschrift (symposium) to honour his career was held at the World Congress of Herpetology in Dunedin, New Zealand, in 2020.

The Chinese Zoological Society gave him their International Research Collaboration Award in 2022, and he was the International Collen-Francqui Professor at the University of Antwerp, Belgium, in 2023.

A newly identified species of venomous Australian snake, Shine's whipsnake (Demansia shinei), was named in his honour in 2007.
