= Sombre whipsnake =

Demansia quaesitor

Conservation status
- Least Concern (IUCN 3.1)

Scientific classification
- Kingdom: Animalia
- Phylum: Chordata
- Class: Reptilia
- Order: Squamata
- Suborder: Serpentes
- Family: Elapidae
- Genus: Demansia
- Species: D. quaesitor

Binomial name
- Demansia quaesitor Shea, 2007

Species of snake

The sombre whip snake (Demansia quaesitor) is a species of venomous snake in the family Elapidae.
