= Grey whipsnake =

Demansia simplex

Conservation status
- Least Concern (IUCN 3.1)

Scientific classification
- Kingdom: Animalia
- Phylum: Chordata
- Class: Reptilia
- Order: Squamata
- Suborder: Serpentes
- Family: Elapidae
- Genus: Demansia
- Species: D. simplex

Binomial name
- Demansia simplex Storr, 1978

Species of snake

The grey whipsnake (Demansia simplex) is a species of venomous snake in the family Elapidae.
