= Shine's whipsnake =

Demansia shinei

Conservation status
- Least Concern (IUCN 3.1)

Scientific classification
- Kingdom: Animalia
- Phylum: Chordata
- Class: Reptilia
- Order: Squamata
- Suborder: Serpentes
- Family: Elapidae
- Genus: Demansia
- Species: D. shinei

Binomial name
- Demansia shinei Shea, 2007

Species of snake

Shine's whipsnake (Demansia shinei) also known commonly as Shine's Australian whipsnake, is a species of venomous snake in the family Elapidae. The species is endemic to Australia.

== Etymology ==
The specific name, shinei, is in honour of Australian herpetologist Richard "Rick" Shine.

== Geographic range ==
D. shinei is found in Northern Territory and Western Australia, Australia.

== Habitat ==
The preferred natural habitats of D. shinei are desert, rocky areas, grassland, shrubland, and savanna.

== Description ==
Medium-sized for its genus, D. shinei may attain a snout-to-vent length (SVL) of 62 cm (24 in). Dorsally, it is pale grey-brown. Ventrally, it is lemon yellow. The top of the head is brown, followed by a narrow yellow crossband on the nape, followed by a wider brown crossband.

== Reproduction ==
D. shinei is oviparous.
