= Rufous whipsnake =

Demansia rufescens

Conservation status
- Least Concern (IUCN 3.1)

Scientific classification
- Kingdom: Animalia
- Phylum: Chordata
- Class: Reptilia
- Order: Squamata
- Suborder: Serpentes
- Family: Elapidae
- Genus: Demansia
- Species: D. rufescens

Binomial name
- Demansia rufescens Storr, 1978

Species of snake

The rufous whip snake (Demansia rufescens) is a species of venomous snake in the family Elapidae.
