= Black-necked whipsnake =

Conservation status
- Least Concern (IUCN 3.1)

Scientific classification
- Kingdom: Animalia
- Phylum: Chordata
- Class: Reptilia
- Order: Squamata
- Suborder: Serpentes
- Family: Elapidae
- Genus: Demansia
- Species: D. calodera

Binomial name
- Demansia calodera Storr, 1978

Species of snake

The black-necked whipsnake (Demansia calodera) is a species of venomous snake in the family Elapidae. It is endemic to Western Australia. It can reach 517 mm (20.4 in) in snout–vent length.
