= Long-tailed whipsnake =

Demansia flagellatio

Conservation status
- Least Concern (IUCN 3.1)

Scientific classification
- Kingdom: Animalia
- Phylum: Chordata
- Class: Reptilia
- Order: Squamata
- Suborder: Serpentes
- Family: Elapidae
- Genus: Demansia
- Species: D. flagellatio

Binomial name
- Demansia flagellatio Wells & Wellington, 1985

Species of snake

The long-tailed whip snake (Demansia flagellatio), also known as the Carpentarian whipsnake, is a species of venomous snake in the family Elapidae.
