= Narrow-headed whipsnake =

Demansia angusticeps

Conservation status
- Least Concern (IUCN 3.1)

Scientific classification
- Kingdom: Animalia
- Phylum: Chordata
- Class: Reptilia
- Order: Squamata
- Suborder: Serpentes
- Family: Elapidae
- Genus: Demansia
- Species: D. angusticeps

Binomial name
- Demansia angusticeps (Macleay, 1888)

Species of snake

The narrow-headed whipsnake (Demansia angusticeps) is a species of venomous snake in the family Elapidae native to Western Australia.
