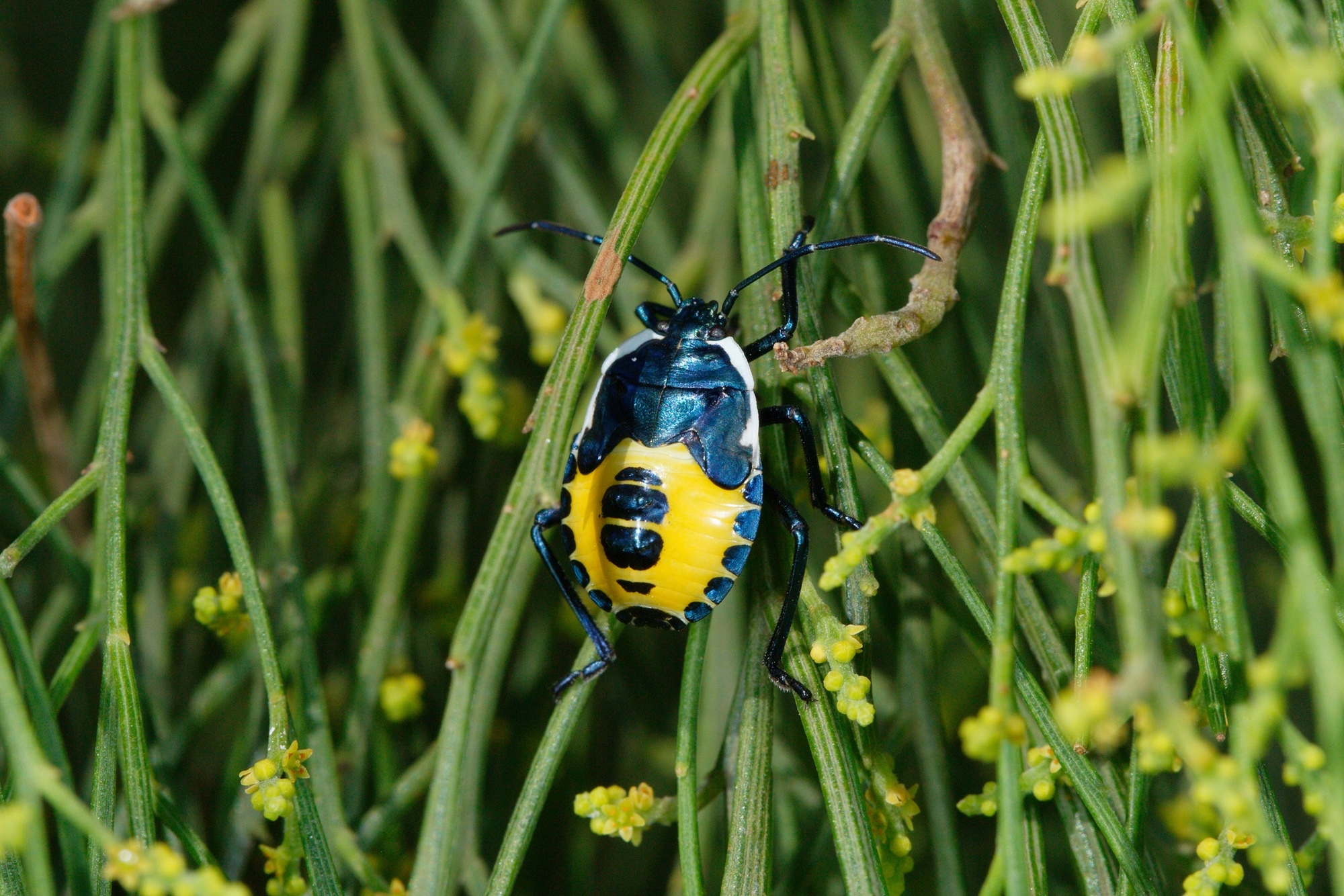
- Commius elegans

Scientific classification
- Kingdom: Animalia
- Phylum: Arthropoda
- Clade: Pancrustacea
- Class: Insecta
- Order: Hemiptera
- Suborder: Heteroptera
- Family: Pentatomidae
- Subfamily: Pentatominae
- Tribe: Diemeniini
- Genus: Commius; Stål, 1876

Species
- Commius elegans (Donovan, 1805); Commius minor Bergroth, 1905

= Commius (bug) =

Genus of true bugs

Commius is a genus of Australian shield bugs in the tribe Diemeniini.
