= Soil-crack whipsnake =

Demansia rimicola

Conservation status
- Least Concern (IUCN 3.1)

Scientific classification
- Kingdom: Animalia
- Phylum: Chordata
- Class: Reptilia
- Order: Squamata
- Suborder: Serpentes
- Family: Elapidae
- Genus: Demansia
- Species: D. rimicola

Binomial name
- Demansia rimicola Scanlon, 2007

Species of snake

The soil-crack whip snake or crack-dwelling whipsnake (Demansia rimicola) is a species of venomous snake in the family Elapidae. It is only mildly venomous.

== Taxonomy ==
Australia's venomous land snakes, also known as Elapidae, are a monophyletic group consisting of almost 100 species, and comprise almost 70% of all snake fauna throughout Australia.

The soil-crack whip snake was initially named the 'collared whipsnake' (Demansia torquate) in 1862. It was not until 2007 that it was discovered that there were 2 species, one located in coastal Queensland, and the other in central Australia which we now know as the soil-crack whip snake (Demansia rimicola).

The year of 2007, it was Scanlon who taxonomically identified the soil-crack ship snake. The word 'Demansia' meaning whipsnakes of Australia and New Guinea were a specific group of medium-long snakes which were large eyed and fast moving. It was described to have a moderately large snout, with a dark collar on the nape which was often less distinct in adults. It was described as darker than other Demansia and therefore was one of the reasons it was able to be differentiated.

== Description ==
The soil-crack whipsnake is front fanged and average about 49 cm in length. They are a slender grey to olive brown, presenting a dark band behind the head and a belly that is bright orange-red.

They have been identified as having moderately large stouts up to 740mm compared to other Demansia, and will often have dark spots on their heads. This is identified via a thin piece of tissue located near another teardrop marking., creating the illusion of 2 pale, merging blobs. This differentiates the soil-crack whip snake from other species as well as the nature of the head markings. In particular the markings on their head appear sharply angulated as 2 prominent diverging rows on their anterior ventral's. It once again becomes further differentiated from other species such as D. angusticeps and D. olivaea as its broad and dark nape band is edged with cream making it more prominent and consequently greater in size.

The body has been described as mid-brown, yellow pigment on the scales which often have been concentrated centrally to give broad dark, and narrow pale stripes along the edge of the snake. They have also been found to have a throat which is strongly marbled with dark brown which dissipates posteriorly along the lateral ventral's.

== Distribution ==
Soil-crack whipsnakes can be found around Tibooburra and the Sturt National Park in far northwestern New South Wales.

== Habitat and ecology ==
This snake is mostly diurnal, using flat rocks, fallen timber, debris, rock crevices, deep soil crack, grass clumps and animal burrows for shelter. they prefer biomes of open forests, woodlands or shrubland that have plenty of grass and shrubs to live amongst. they're main food source is small lizards and snakes which they chase and hunt.

The whipsnakes ecology has been specifically adapted to hunt prey which is fast moving. As there has been little study conducted on Demansia rimicola, it is often compared to other species of Demansia such as D. torquata, as their ecology seems to be very similar. When studying the ovulation of these animals, it was found that female reproductive cycles are strongly seasonal and will often ovulate in spring. In terms of body size, males seem to be larger in Eastern species of Demansia and this has strong to correlation to the idea of superiority within the species. It has been previously suggested that the main type of prey for Demansia is lizards, however it has been recently investigated that approximately 27% of their diet consists of vertebrate prey such as frogs. This is surprising especially considering the drier habitats which they live in. Whipsnakes have a unique style of hunting involving visually locating their prey of a daytime, and then hunting them of an evening when they are inactive usually by scent.

== Conservation ==
The soil-crack whipsnake is a vulnerable animal which faces a few major threats. Grazing and cultivation tend to destroy their habitat, soil cracks and fallen timber. Predation from foxes and cats can also become a major issue and, although they are of least concern, a lack of knowledge and management of these possible threats can quickly cause a decline in numbers.

Controlling pests such as goats, foxes and cats can help to stop predation as well as grazing from the goats. To regenerate and retain habitat, stock intensities can be reduced or exclude grazing to help vegetation regrow and cultivation should be restricted around remnant habitats. It is key to retain the grassland they live in which can be achieved by ensuring the full cycle of grass development such as seed setting and tussock formation. Stop the removal of stick and leaf litter, understory shrubs and fallen logs as habitat for the species, other types of habitat to maintain include species of Triodia and any nesting sites or food sources. These strategies are important to boost this species since it is still listed as vulnerable.
