= Whip snake =

Whip snake may refer to:

== Genera ==
- Ahaetulla, endemic to southern Asia, from India to Vietnam
- Demansia, endemic to Australia, Papua New Guinea, and nearby islands
- Dryophiops, endemic to Southeast Asia
- Hemorrhois, endemic to the western Mediterranean, west, central, and southern Asia
- Hierophis, endemic to southern Europe
- Masticophis, endemic to the Americas
- Psammophis, endemic to Africa and Asia

== Species ==
- Caspian whipsnake (Dolichophis caspius), found in the Balkans and Eastern Europe
- Red whip snake (Platyceps collaris), found in Bulgaria and the Levant
- Suta dwyeri, found in Australia from New South Wales to South Queensland
- White-lipped snake (Drysdalia coronoides), found in Tasmania and southeastern Australia
