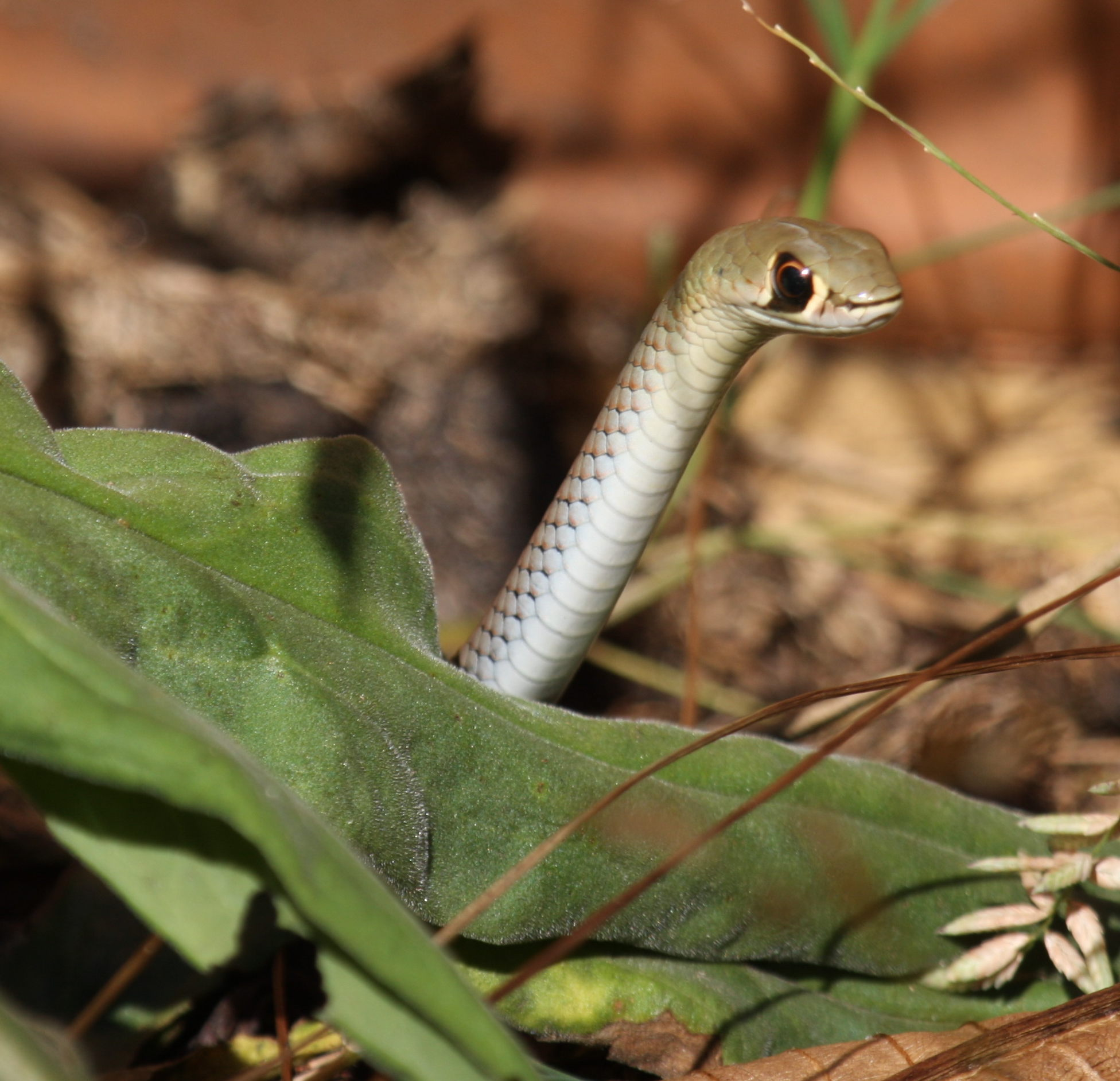
- Demansia psammophis, yellow-faced whip snake

Scientific classification
- Kingdom: Animalia
- Phylum: Chordata
- Class: Reptilia
- Order: Squamata
- Suborder: Serpentes
- Family: Elapidae
- Subfamily: Hydrophiinae
- Genus: Demansia; Gray, 1842

= Demansia =

Genus of snakes

Demansia is a genus of venomous snakes of the family Elapidae. Members of the genus are commonly known as whip snakes or whipsnakes, as are members of several other genera.

== Description ==
All species of the genus Demansia are gray, brown, gray-green, or beige, save for Demansia psammophis (yellow-faced whip snake), which may be cream-coloured. Whip snakes are long and slender. They have large eyes and relatively small heads that are only slightly wider than their bodies. All species in the genus Demansia are venomous.

== Distribution ==
Whip snakes of the genus Demansia are found in Australia, Papua New Guinea in the area around Port Moresby, and nearby islands.

== Diet ==
Demansia whip snakes eat mainly lizards. They are diurnal (active in the day) and use their keen eyesight to hunt. Their prey dies quickly from the effects of the snake's venom.

== Interaction with humans ==
Their bites are generally regarded as akin to a bee sting and relatively harmless.

== Species ==
The following 15 species are recognized as being valid.

- Demansia angusticeps (Macleay, 1888) – narrow-headed whipsnake
- Demansia calodera Storr, 1978 – black-necked whipsnake
- Demansia cyanochasma Nankivell, Maryan, Bush & Hutchinson, 2023 – desert whipsnake
- Demansia flagellatio Wells & Wellington, 1985 – long-tailed whipsnake
- Demansia olivacea (Gray, 1842) – olive whipsnake
- Demansia papuensis (Macleay, 1877) – greater black whipsnake
- Demansia psammophis (Schlegel, 1837) – yellow-faced whipsnake
- Demansia quaesitor Shea, 2007 – sombre whipsnake
- Demansia reticulata (Gray, 1842) – reticulated whipsnake
- Demansia rimicola Scanlon, 2007 – soil-crack whipsnake
- Demansia rufescens Storr, 1978 – rufous whip snake
- Demansia shinei Shea, 2007 – Shine's whipsnake
- Demansia simplex Storr, 1978 – grey whipsnake
- Demansia torquata (Günther, 1862) – collared whipsnake
- Demansia vestigiata (De Vis, 1884) – lesser black whipsnake

Nota bene: A binomial authority in parentheses indicates that the species was originally described in a genus other than Demansia.

== See also ==
- Whip snake (disambiguation)
