= Reticulated whipsnake =

Demansia reticulata

Conservation status
- Least Concern (IUCN 3.1)

Scientific classification
- Kingdom: Animalia
- Phylum: Chordata
- Class: Reptilia
- Order: Squamata
- Suborder: Serpentes
- Family: Elapidae
- Genus: Demansia
- Species: D. reticulata

Binomial name
- Demansia reticulata (JE Gray, 1842)

Species of snake

The reticulated whip snake (Demansia reticulata) is a species of venomous snake in the family Elapidae.
