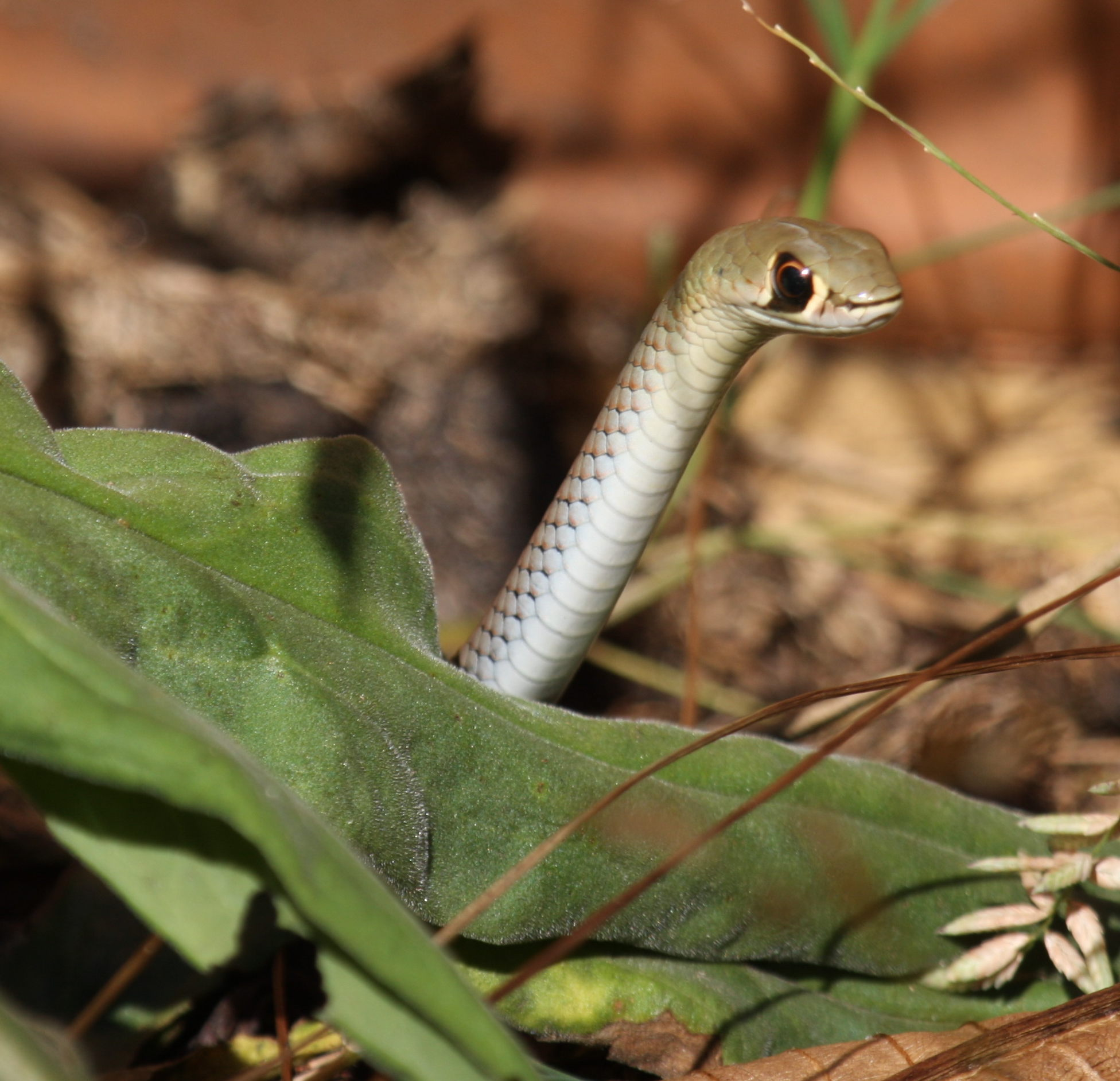

Conservation status
- Least Concern (IUCN 3.1)

Scientific classification
- Kingdom: Animalia
- Phylum: Chordata
- Class: Reptilia
- Order: Squamata
- Suborder: Serpentes
- Family: Elapidae
- Genus: Demansia
- Species: D. psammophis

Binomial name
- Demansia psammophis (Schlegel, 1837)

Synonyms
- Elaps psammophis Schlegel, 1837; Diemenia psammophis (Schlegel, 1837); Pseudelaps psammophidius A.M.C. Duméril, Bibron & A.H.A. Duméril, 1854; Demansia reticulata cupreiceps Storr, 1978

= Yellow-faced whipsnake =

Yellow-faced whip snake

Species of snake

The yellow-faced whip snake (Demansia psammophis) is a species of venomous snake in the family Elapidae, a family containing many dangerous snakes. D. psammophis is endemic to Australia, found throughout the continent in a variety of habitats from coastal fringes to interior arid scrubland.

== Taxonomy ==
The yellow-faced whip snake is part of the genus Demansia, a group of venomous snakes in the family Elapidae. This genus is composed of whip snakes, characterized by their large eyes and whip-like tail. The genus Demansia is commonly found in the Southern hemisphere around Australia and equatorial countries such as Papua New Guinea. 15 species are assigned to the genus Demansia.

== Description ==
D. psammophis is a thin snake with a narrow head. It grows up to a total length (tail included) of 1 m (39 in), averaging around 80 cm (31 in), females being slightly smaller than males. Characterized by its narrow yellowish head, pale ring around the eyes, and a dark marking curving along the upper lip, D. psammophis becomes distinguishable from other Demansia snakes. Juveniles can be distinguished as a white-edged dark line is seen across the snout. The large prominent eyes surrounded by a pale ring, account for its ability to be a successful diurnal species, having the largest eyes of any Australian snake assisting in prey capture. The colour of the yellow-faced whip snake varies, ranging from olive green, to grey and brown; however, a common characteristic in colour is a "red flush along the anterior third of its back".

To accurately identify this species, there must be a clear view of the head, and the dorsal scales at the snake's mid-body must be counted. D. psammophis has 15 mid-body dorsal scale rows and 165–230 ventrals, with the anal and subcaudals divided. D. psammophis is commonly confused with the eastern brown snake (Pseudonaja textilis), due to their similar appearance.

== Distribution and habitat ==
D. psammophis is distributed throughout the Australian continent, with presence in every state except Tasmania. Although the distribution of D. psammophis is wide, it is endemic to Australia. Found in a variety of habitats across Australia, D. psammophis ranges from coastal forests to arid scrublands and grasslands in Australia's interior. It is not uncommon to find more than one D. psammophis as they are community dwellers. Habitats in rock crevices and under logs are common community habitats with communities often aggregating in winter months.

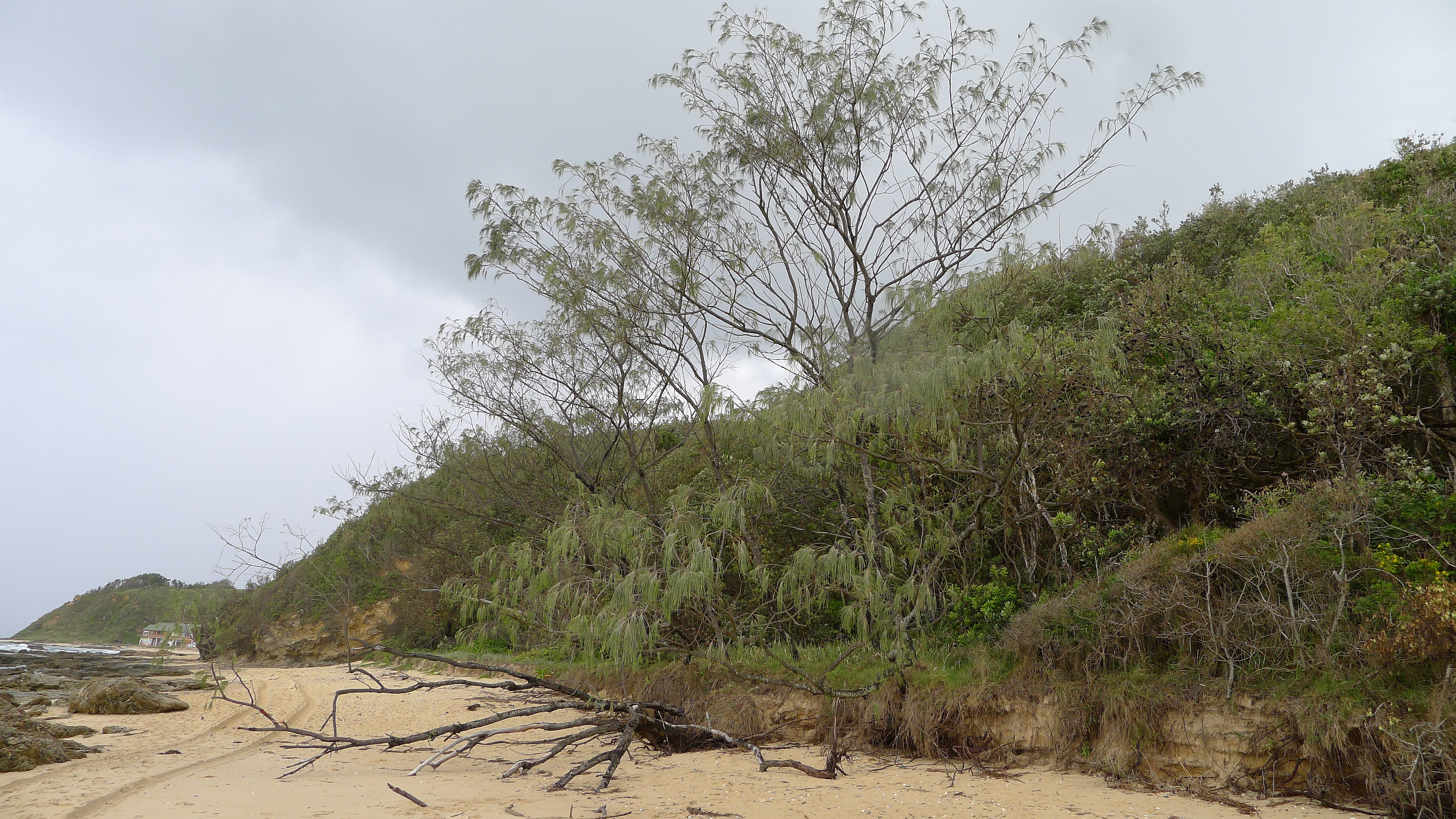
Coastal she-oak growing on sand dunes. Nambucca, New South Wales, Australia

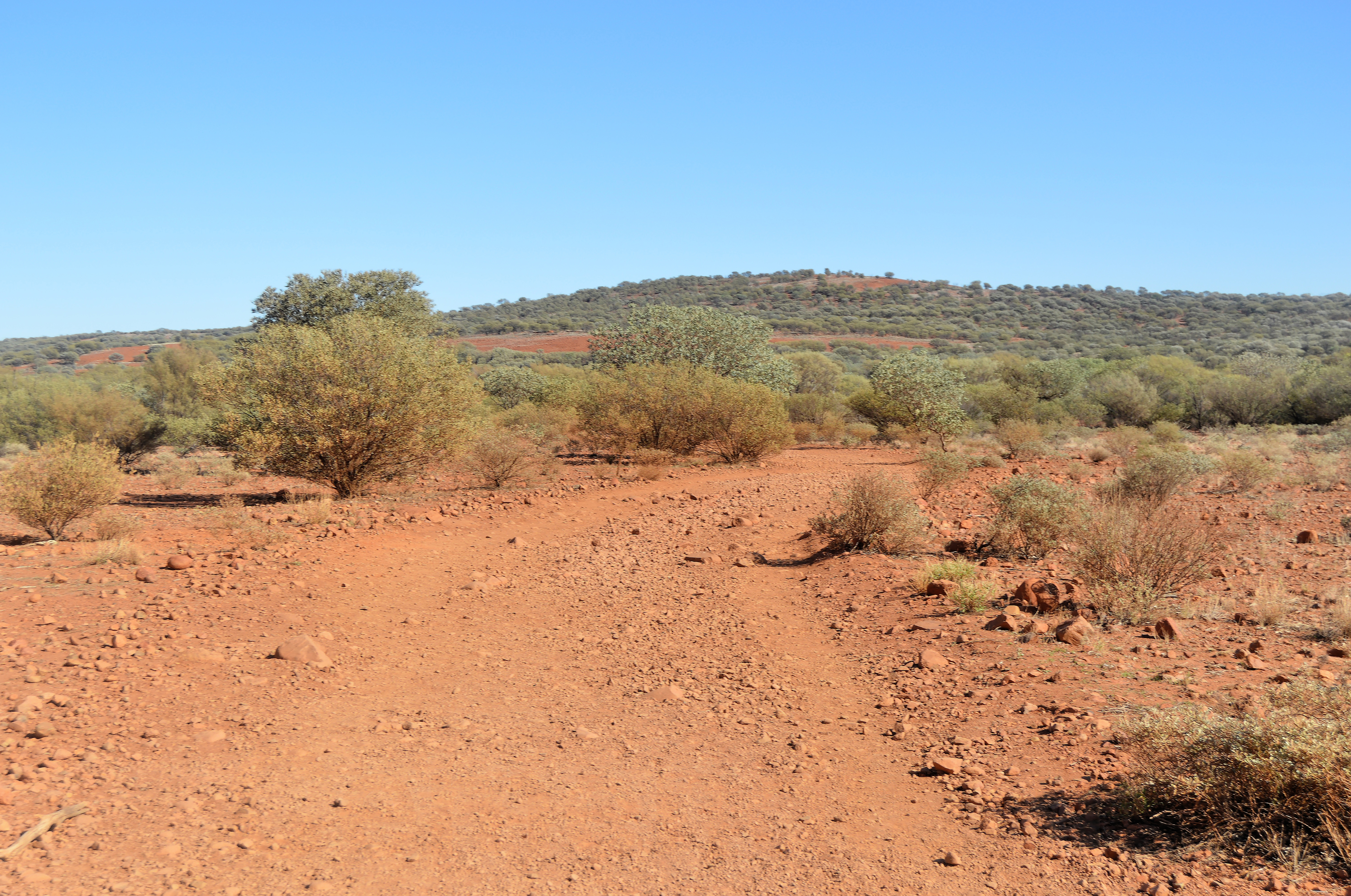
Scrubland near Kata Tjuta, Northern Territory, Australia

== Behaviour ==
D. psammophis is a diurnal reptile, fast-moving with a nervous disposition, always alert and fleeing quickly when disturbed. The yellow-faced whip snake is subject to brumation, or slowing down its movements, in the winter months, usually only moving to seek sun and water.

== Reproduction ==
D. psammophis is oviparous, laying clutches of 5–6 and 15–20 amniotic eggs. Communal egg laying is also common in this species, with some nests having 500–600 eggs present. D. psammophis females experience vitellogenesis between September and November, ovulating in late spring or summer. Eggs are laid in February and March, and each hatchling has an approximate snout-to-vent length (SVL) of 17 cm (6.7 in).

== Diet ==
Small diurnal lizards, and lizard eggs are the main source of food for D. psammophis. Although diurnal, it forages during the night, catching nocturnal forms such as geckos, lerista, and frogs.

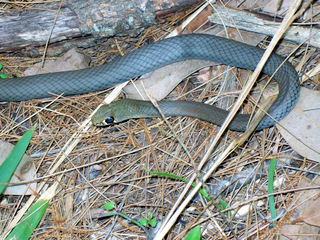
Demansia psammophis at Cowan Creek, Ku-ring-gai Chase National Park, Australia

== Predation and venom ==
Small reptiles such as skinks and other lizards are predated on by D. psammophis during the day. Juvenile D. psammophis have been observed to constrict their prey. However, as they become adults, constriction becomes uncommon, with the species occasionally creating a single body loop to restrain its prey. To immobilize and kill prey, D. psammophis lashes out and injects toxic venom, slowing and eventually killing its prey.

Although this venom is deadly to other reptiles and amphibians, it is not considered dangerous to humans. If bitten, the bite will be painful, and the injection of venom will cause localized pain and swelling, ranging from moderate to severe, with some bites causing systemic symptoms such as paralysis and bleeding. Medical treatment should be sought following any snake bite.

== Conservation ==
The yellow-faced whip snake is currently classified as "least concern" under the IUCN Red List and is considered stable.

The species is secure under the status of "least concern" in the majority of states and territories in Australia, including Queensland and the Northern Territory. However, it is considered "near-threatened" in Victoria.

D. psammophis is not found in Tasmania due to the Bass Strait that separates it from mainland Australia and the climatic conditions of Tasmania.

== Sources ==
- Weigel, John (2002). Australian Reptile Park's Guide to Snakes of South-east Australia. ISBN 0-646-00006-3. (Demansia psammophis, p. 50).
- Cogger, Harold G. (2018). Reptiles and Amphibians of Australia, Updated Seventh Edition. Clayton, Victoria, Australia: CSIRO Publishing. 1,080 pp. ISBN 978-1486309696.
- "Demansia psammophis ". Integrated Taxonomic Information System. www.itis.gov.
