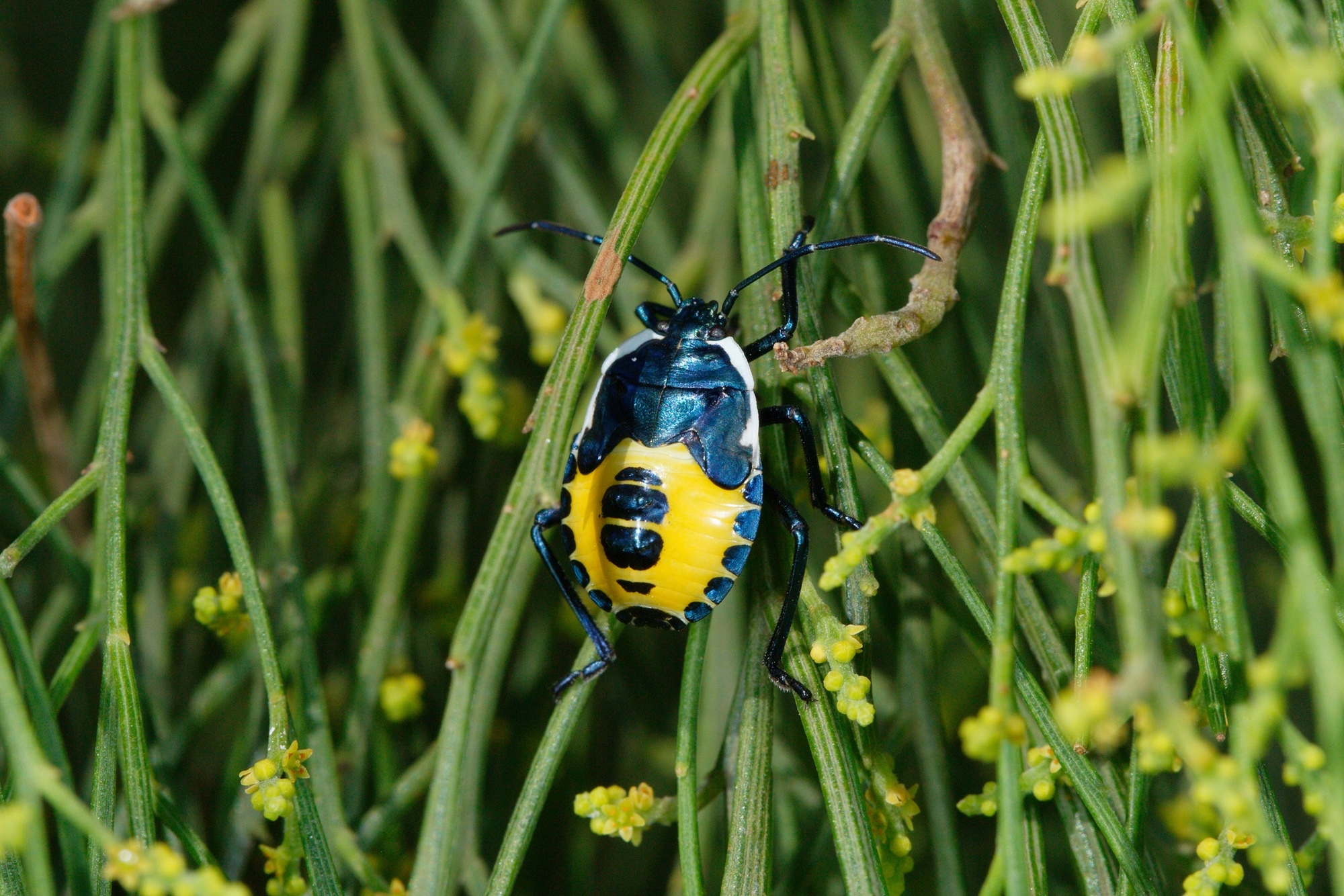
- Commius elegans

Scientific classification
- Kingdom: Animalia
- Phylum: Arthropoda
- Clade: Pancrustacea
- Class: Insecta
- Order: Hemiptera
- Suborder: Heteroptera
- Family: Pentatomidae
- Subfamily: Pentatominae
- Tribe: Diemeniini; Kirkaldy, 1909

Type genus
- Diemenia Spinola, 1850

Genera
- See text

Synonyms
- Platycorini Bergroth, 1905

= Diemeniini =

Tribe of true bugs

Diemeniini is a tribe of Australian realm shield bugs in the subfamily Pentatominae.

== Genera ==
Alphenor – Aplerotus – Boocoris – Caridophthalmus – Commius – Diemenia – Eurynannus – Gilippus – Grossimenia – Kalkadoona – Myappena – Niarius – Oncocoris – Pseudoncocoris
