= List of endemic reptiles of Papua New Guinea =

This is a list of the endemic reptile species recorded in Papua New Guinea.

== Turtles ==
Scientific name	Common name	Family
Chelodina novaeguineae	New Guinea Snake-necked Turtle	Chelidae
Chelodina parkeri	Parker's Snake-necked Turtle	Chelidae
Chelodina pritchardi	Pritchard's Snake-necked Turtle	Chelidae

== Lizards ==
Scientific name	Common name	Family
Hypsilurus capreolatus		Agamidae
Hypsilurus ornatus		Agamidae
Hypsilurus papuensis	Papua Forest Dragon	Agamidae
Hypsilurus schoedei	Vogt's Forest Dragon	Agamidae
Cyrtodactylus arcanus		Gekkonidae
Cyrtodactylus capreoloides		Gekkonidae
Cyrtodactylus derongo	Derongo Bow-fingered Gecko	Gekkonidae
Cyrtodactylus epiroticus		Gekkonidae
Cyrtodactylus equestris		Gekkonidae
Cyrtodactylus klugei		Gekkonidae
Cyrtodactylus loriae		Gekkonidae
Cyrtodactylus louisiadensis		Gekkonidae
Cyrtodactylus medioclivus		Gekkonidae
Cyrtodactylus minor		Gekkonidae
Cyrtodactylus murua		Gekkonidae
Cyrtodactylus rex		Gekkonidae
Cyrtodactylus robustus		Gekkonidae
Cyrtodactylus serratus		Gekkonidae
Cyrtodactylus tanim		Gekkonidae
Cyrtodactylus tripartitus		Gekkonidae
Gehyra membranacruralis	Port Moresby Dtella	Gekkonidae
Gehyra rohan		Gekkonidae
Lepidodactylus browni	Brown's Scaly-toed Gecko	Gekkonidae
Lepidodactylus magnus	Mountain Scaly-toed Gecko	Gekkonidae
Lepidodactylus mutahi	Bougainville Scaly-toed Gecko	Gekkonidae
Lepidodactylus orientalis		Gekkonidae
Lepidodactylus pulcher	Admiralty Scaly-toed Gecko	Gekkonidae
Nactus acutus		Gekkonidae
Nactus kunan	Bumblebee Gecko	Gekkonidae
Nactus sphaerodactylodes		Gekkonidae
Carlia aenigma		Scincidae
Carlia ailanpalai	Curious Skink	Scincidae
Carlia aramia		Scincidae
Carlia bicarinata		Scincidae
Carlia eothen		Scincidae
Carlia luctuosa	Black-cowled Four-fingered Skink	Scincidae
Carlia mysi		Scincidae
Cryptoblepharus furvus		Scincidae
Cryptoblepharus richardsi		Scincidae
Cryptoblepharus xenikos		Scincidae
Cryptoblepharus yulensis	Yule Island Snake-eyed Skink	Scincidae
Emoia bismarckensis		Scincidae
Emoia coggeri	Cogger's Emo Skink	Scincidae
Emoia guttata	Allison's Emo Skink	Scincidae
Emoia mivarti	Admiralty Five-striped Skink	Scincidae
Emoia montana	Mountain Emo Skink	Scincidae
Emoia popei	Pope's Emo Skink	Scincidae
Emoia submetallica	Madeay's Emo Skink	Scincidae
Emoia tetrataenia	Four-striped Emo Skink	Scincidae
Fojia bumui	Fojia Skink	Scincidae
Geomyersia coggeri	Cogger's Island Skink	Scincidae
Lipinia albodorsalis		Scincidae
Lipinia longiceps	Long Lipinia	Scincidae
Lipinia rouxi	Roux's Lipinia	Scincidae
Lobulia alpina		Scincidae
Lobulia stellaris		Scincidae
Lobulia subalpina		Scincidae
Lygisaurus curtus		Scincidae
Papuascincus buergersi		Scincidae
Papuascincus phaeodes		Scincidae
Prasinohaema flavipes	Common Green Tree Skink	Scincidae
Prasinohaema prehensicauda	Prehensile-tailed Green-blooded Skink	Scincidae
Sphenomorphus aignanus		Scincidae
Sphenomorphus annectens		Scincidae
Sphenomorphus anotus		Scincidae
Sphenomorphus brunneus		Scincidae
Sphenomorphus cinereus		Scincidae
Sphenomorphus darlingtoni		Scincidae
Sphenomorphus forbesi	Slender Litter Skink	Scincidae
Sphenomorphus fragilis		Scincidae
Sphenomorphus fragosus		Scincidae
Sphenomorphus granulatus		Scincidae
Sphenomorphus leptofasciatus	Slender Banded Skink	Scincidae
Sphenomorphus loriae		Scincidae
Sphenomorphus louisiadensis		Scincidae
Sphenomorphus microtympanum		Scincidae
Sphenomorphus neuhaussi		Scincidae
Sphenomorphus nigrolineatus		Scincidae
Sphenomorphus taylori	Taylor's Solomon Skink	Scincidae
Sphenomorphus transversus		Scincidae
Tribolonotus annectens	New Britain Crocodile Skink	Scincidae
Tribolonotus brongersmai	Admiralty Crocodile Skink	Scincidae
Tribolonotus parkeri		Scincidae
Tribolonotus pseudoponceleti	Western Crocodile Skink	Scincidae
Varanus bogerti	Fergusson Island Monitor	Varanidae
Varanus douarrha	New Ireland Monitor	Varanidae
Varanus semotus	Mussau Monitor	Varanidae
Varanus telenesetes	Rossel Island Monitor	Varanidae

== Snakes ==
Scientific name	Common name	Family
Dendrelaphis papuensis	Papuan Tree Snake	Colubridae
Stegonotus admiraltiensis	Admiralty Ground Snake	Colubridae
Stegonotus guentheri	Milne Bay Ground Snake	Colubridae
Stegonotus heterurus	Bismarck Ground Snake	Colubridae
Stegonotus melanolabiatus	Black-lipped Ground Snake	Colubridae
Stegonotus poechi		Colubridae
Tropidonophis aenigmaticus	East Papuan Keelback	Colubridae
Tropidonophis dahlii	New Britain Keelback	Colubridae
Tropidonophis dolasii		Colubridae
Tropidonophis hypomelas	Bismarck Keelback	Colubridae
Tropidonophis parkeri	Highland Keelback	Colubridae
Aspidomorphus lineaticollis	Striped Crown Snake	Elapidae
Hydrophis vorisi	Estuarine Sea Snake	Elapidae
Laticauda guineai	Papuan Sea Krain	Elapidae
Parapistocalamus hedigeri	Bougainville Coral Snake	Elapidae
Toxicocalamus buergersi	Buergers' Forest Snake	Elapidae
Toxicocalamus cratermontanus		Elapidae
Toxicocalamus ernstmayri	Star Mountains Worm-Eating Snake	Elapidae
Toxicocalamus holopelturus	Mount Rossel Forest Snake	Elapidae
Toxicocalamus longissimus	Woodlark Forest Snake	Elapidae
Toxicocalamus mintoni		Elapidae
Toxicocalamus misimae	Misima Island Forest Snake	Elapidae
Toxicocalamus nigrescens		Elapidae
Toxicocalamus pachysomus		Elapidae
Toxicocalamus spilolepidotus	Spotted Forest Snake	Elapidae
Gerrhopilus addisoni		Gerrhopilidae
Gerrhopilus depressiceps	Lowland Beaked Blindsnake	Gerrhopilidae
Gerrhopilus eurydice		Gerrhopilidae
Gerrhopilus fredparkeri		Gerrhopilidae
Gerrhopilus hades		Gerrhopilidae
Gerrhopilus inornatus	Montane Blindsnake	Gerrhopilidae
Gerrhopilus lestes		Gerrhopilidae
Gerrhopilus mcdowelli		Gerrhopilidae
Gerrhopilus persephone		Gerrhopilidae
Bothrochilus boa	Bismarck Ringed Python	Pythonidae
Bothrochilus fredparkeri	Karimui Basin White-lipped Python	Pythonidae
Bothrochilus huonensis	Huon White-lipped Python	Pythonidae
Bothrochilus montanus	Wau White-lipped Python	Pythonidae
Acutotyphlops kunuaensis	Kunua Blindsnake	Typhlopidae
Acutotyphlops solomonis		Typhlopidae
Acutotyphlops subocularis	Bismarck Sharp-nosed Blindsnake	Typhlopidae

== See also ==
- Fauna of New Guinea
- List of endemic amphibians of Papua New Guinea
- List of endemic fish of Papua New Guinea
- List of birds of Papua New Guinea
- List of butterflies of Papua New Guinea
- List of mammals of Papua New Guinea
