= Huon Peninsula =

Peninsula on the island of New Guinea

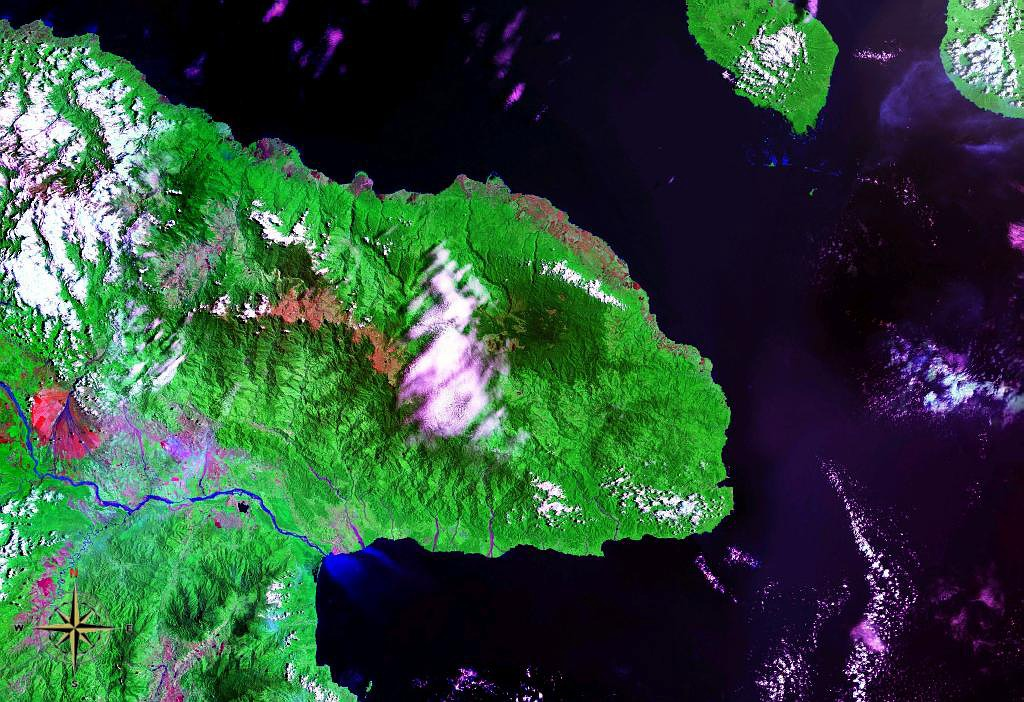
Huon Peninsula seen from space (false color)

Huon Peninsula is a large rugged peninsula on the island of New Guinea in Morobe Province, eastern Papua New Guinea. It is named after French explorer Jean-Michel Huon de Kermadec. The peninsula is dominated by the steep Saruwaged and Finisterre and Cromwell Mountains. The nearest large town is the Morobe provincial capital Lae to the south, while settlements on the north coast include the former German town of Finschhafen, the district capital of Wasu, Malalamai and Saidor with its World War II era Saidor Airport.

The Huon Peninsula is home to a diverse range of indigenous communities, each with their own unique cultures and traditions.

The region is known for its rich biodiversity, with a wide range of flora and fauna that are found nowhere else in the world. The Huon Peninsula Conservation Area is home to numerous endangered species, including the Huon tree kangaroo and the golden-mantled tree kangaroo.

The area was the site of the Huon Peninsula campaign of World War II, in 1943-44 as Japanese troops retreating from Lae fought their way over the Finisterre Mountains to Madang on the north coast.

== History ==
For over 40,000 years, the region has been home to indigenous communities, such as the Yabob and Morwap, who have relied on hunting, fishing, and gathering for their survival. Their way of life remained largely unchanged until the arrival of European explorers in the 16th century. Stone tools dating back to around 40,000 years ago have been discovered by archaeologists on top of stone terraces, they were believed to be used for agricultural purposes.

In the 19th century, Christian missionaries established missions on the peninsula, leading to significant changes in the region's social and cultural landscape. During World War II, the Huon Peninsula played a pivotal role in the Pacific War. The Australian and American militaries established bases in the area, and the peninsula became a major staging ground for military operations. After the war, the Huon Peninsula underwent rapid development, with new infrastructure being built to support the growing population. Agriculture and mining became major industries, attracting people from all over Papua New Guinea.

=== Huon peninsula campaign ===
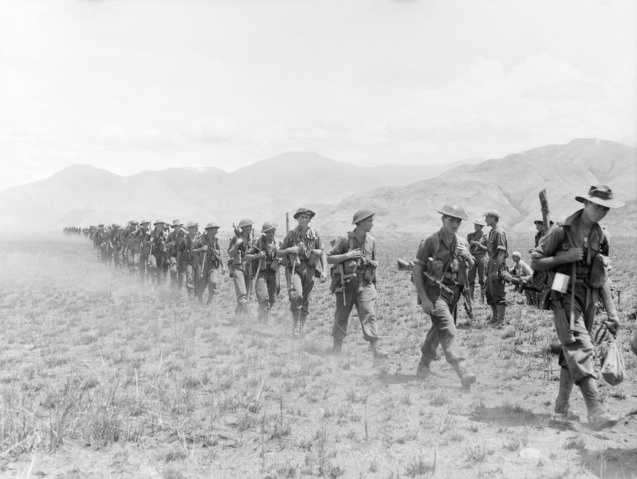

The Huon Peninsula campaign was a series of battles fought in north-eastern Papua New Guinea in 1943–1944 during the Second World War. The campaign formed the initial part of an offensive that the Allies launched in the Pacific in late 1943 and resulted in the Japanese being pushed north from Lae to Sio on the northern coast of New Guinea over the course of a four-month period. The campaign was preceded by an amphibious landing by troops from the Australian 9th Division east of Lae on 4 September 1943.

== Inhabitants ==
Below is a table containing some of the traditional inhabitants of the region, their spoken languages, and some notes about their culture. This list is incomplete and there are many other peoples in the area each with diverse set of customs and traditions.

Ethnic groups	Languages spoken	Cultural practices
Morobean	Tok Pisin, English, and several indigenous languages such as Yabem, Bukawa, and Nalik	Traditional music, dance, and art; customary land tenure systems; subsistence agriculture
Siassi Islanders	Siassi language, Tok Pisin	Traditional seafaring and fishing techniques; weaving; oral storytelling
Tewae-Siassi people	Tewae-Siassi language, Tok Pisin	Traditional farming practices; basket weaving; spiritual beliefs centered around the environment and ancestral spirits
Kamula Doso people	Kamula Doso language, Tok Pisin	Traditional hunting and gathering practices; elaborate face and body tattoos; ritual scarification
Bongu people	Bongu language, Tok Pisin	Traditional farming and fishing practices; elaborate woven mats; reverence for ancestors and spirits of the natural world

== Geography ==
The Huon Peninsula is a part of the New Guinea Orogen, which is a mountain range that was formed as a result of the collision between the Australian and Pacific tectonic plates. It is known for its complex geology, including repeated episodic uplift events. These uplift events have resulted in the formation of regressive terraces that are cut into raised late Quaternary reef tracts. The peninsula is primarily composed of sedimentary and volcanic rocks, with a few areas of metamorphic rocks. The Huon Peninsula also has significant mineral deposits, including gold, copper, and silver. The area around the town of Wau in the central part of the peninsula was once a major gold mining center during the colonial era, and remnants of the mining operations can still be seen in the area today.

The limestone formations on the peninsula have also contributed to the unique landscape of the region. Studies have shown that up to six regressive terraces occur on the youngest Holocene reef tract, while up to 15 occur on older reef tracts II and III. These tracts span the interval from 33,000 to 52,000 years ago, and the uplift events are believed to be coseismic, meaning they are caused by earthquakes. The mean recurrence interval of uplift events was found to be between 1,000 and 1,300 years in both the Holocene and late Pleistocene periods. The amplitude of uplift events averages around 3 meters, and generally increases from northwest to southeast in keeping with the regional late Quaternary trend. However, for some events, the uplift is approximately horizontal over 20 kilometers.

=== Rivers ===
River Name	Estimated Length (km)
Markham River	~120 km
Ramu River	~640 km
Mape River	Unknown
Waria River	Unknown
Kikori River	Unknown
Purari River	Unknown
Vanapa River	Unknown

=== Mountains ===
Name	Elevation (meters)	Coordinates	Note
Mount Boising	4,150	5°57′S 146°22′E	Mount Boising is the colloquial (though unofficial) name for the highest point in the Peninsula's Finisterre Range. Until its summiting in 2014, it may have been the world's most prominent unclimbed peak.
Mount Sarawaget	4,121	6°18′S 147°05′E	Mount Sarawaget is the highest point of the Saruwaged Range.

== Settlements ==
Some of the most notable settlements along the Huon peninsula are listed in a table below.

Settlement Name	Province	Description
Lae	Morobe Province	Largest city in the region, major port and industrial center
Finschhafen	Morobe Province	Historic German colonial town, popular tourist destination
Salamaua	Morobe Province	Former gold-mining town, now mostly abandoned
Wau	Morobe Province	Historic gold-mining town, now a small service center
Bulolo	Morobe Province	Mining town, site of a large gold mine
Madang	Madang Province	Coastal town, popular tourist destination
Bogia	Madang Province	Remote coastal village, known for its traditional culture
Saidor	Madang Province	Coastal town, site of an Allied victory in World War II

== Climate ==
The Huon Peninsula experiences a tropical rainforest climate. This type of climate is characterized by high humidity, high temperatures, and abundant rainfall throughout the year.

The annual average temperature on the peninsula is around 27°C (81°F), with very little seasonal variation. The warmest months are from October to March, when temperatures can reach up to 32°C (90°F).The coolest months are from May to August, with temperatures averaging around 23°C (73°F). The amount of rainfall in the region varies depending on the location, with some areas receiving up to 6,000 millimeters (236 inches) of rain annually. The rainy season typically lasts from December to March, with the heaviest rainfall occurring in February. The dry season, which lasts from June to September, is characterized by less rainfall and lower humidity. The Huon Peninsula also experiences occasional tropical cyclones and monsoons, which can bring extremely heavy rain and strong winds. These weather events can cause flooding and landslides.

== Economy ==
The region is known for its production of cocoa, copra, and palm oil, which are exported to other parts of Papua New Guinea and to international markets. Additionally, small-scale farming is common in the area, with many families growing crops such as bananas, taro, and sweet potato for subsistence and sale.

At intermediate altitudes within the region mandarins are produced as a cash crop.

== Tourism ==
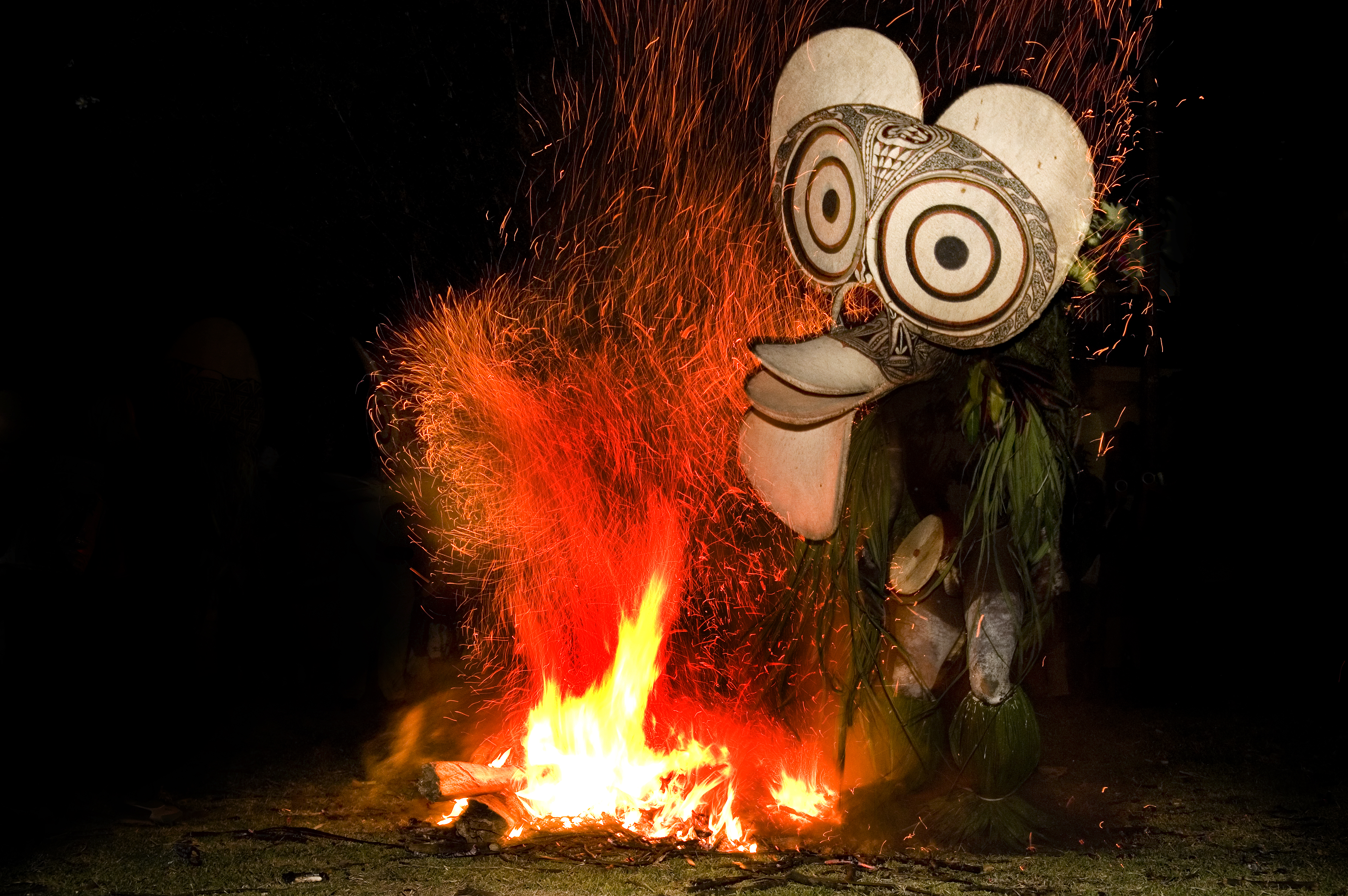

In addition to its natural attractions, Huon Peninsula also has a rich cultural heritage. The region is home to several indigenous communities, each with its unique language, customs, and beliefs. Visitors can learn about these communities by visiting their villages, attending cultural festivals, and participating in traditional ceremonies. Some of the most popular cultural experiences on the peninsula include the Baining Fire Dance, the Morobe Show, and the Sepik River Crocodile Festival.

Some of the most notable sites include the Madang Museum, the War Cemetery in Lae, and the ruins of the Japanese wartime base at Salamaua.

== Agriculture ==
Within several areas of the region some of the local populations practice a type of soil erosion prevention, they do so by weaving the stems of Piper aduncum into 2-3 meter tall fences which are then used to create a type of terrace.

== Flora and fauna ==
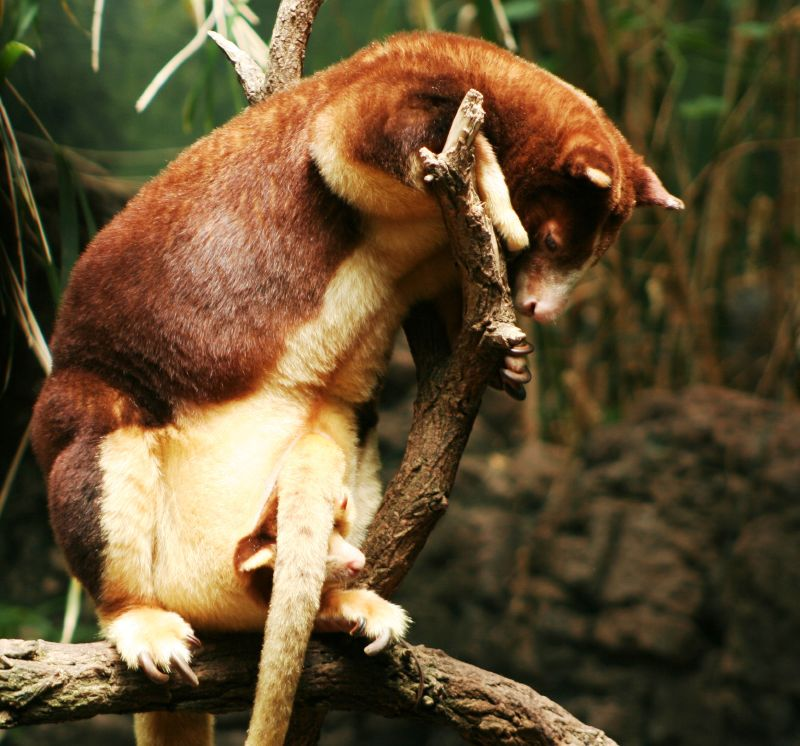
Matschie's tree-kangaroo with baby

The rainforests covering these remote mountains provide habitats for numerous bird and animal species and form part of the Huon Peninsula montane rain forests ecoregion.The forests on the hillsides are characterized by shorter trees and a greater abundance of herbs than lowland rainforests. Dominant tree genera include Pometia, Canarium, Anisoptera, Cryptocarya laurels, and Terminalia. At higher elevations, the forests become denser and are composed of smaller trees. The upper slopes of the Cromwell Range, in particular, contain a well-preserved stand of Dacrydium conifers in the southern hemisphere.

Mammals indigenous to the Huon region include the endangered Matschie's tree-kangaroo, while the birds include many of typical Australasian families such as bowerbirds, Australian robins, honeyeaters (including the endemic spangled honeyeater) and birds of paradise (including the endemic Huon astrapia). There are also endemic butterflies. Although some logging has taken place, the forests of the Huon Peninsula mountains are mostly undisturbed.

=== Frogs & Lizards ===
Below is a table containing some of the frogs and lizards commonly found within the area.

Frogs & lizards found within the Huon Peninsula region
Type	Scientific name
Monitor Lizards	Varanus i. indicus, Varanus p. prasinus
Skinks	Tribolonotus gracilis, Tiliqua scincoides gigas, Sphenomorphus solomonis, Sphenomorphus muelleri, Sphenomorphus minutus, Sphenomorphus jobiensis, Sphenomorphus granulatus, Sphenomorphus derooyae, Sphenomorphus anotus, Prasinohaema v. virens, Prasinohaema flavipes, Lobulia stanleyana, Lobulia elegans, Carlia fusca, Cryptoblepharus boutonii, Emoia atrocostata, Emoia baudini, Emoia c. caeruleocauda, Emoia cyanogaster, Emoia loveridgei, Emoia mivarti, Emoia p. pallidiceps, Emoia physicae, Emoia submetallica, Eugongylus albofasciolatus, Eugongylus rufescens, Lamprolepis smaragdina, Lipinia longiceps, Lipinia noctua, Lipinia pulchra
Agamid lizards	Gonocephalus dilophus, Gonocephalus modestus, Gonocephalus papuensis
Legless Lizard	Lialis jicari
Gecko	Cyrtodactylus novaeguinea, Cyrtodactylus pelagicus, Cyrtodactylus vankampeni, Gehyra interstitialis, Gehyra mutilata, Gehyra vorax Gekko vittatus, Hemidactylus frenatus, Hemiphyllodactylus t. typus, Lepidodactylus lugubris, Lepidodactylus magnus, Lepidodactylus novaeguineae, Cyrtodactylus loriae, Cyrtodactylus louisiadensis
Microhylid frogs	Cophixalus biroi, Cophixalus cheesmanae, Cophixalus pipilans, Cophixalus shellyi, Cophixalus variegatus, Copiula fistulans, Hylophorbus r. rufescens, Oreophryne sp, Phrynomantis lateralis, Phrynomantis robusta, Sphenophryne mehelyi, Sphenophryne palmipes, Sphenophryne polysticta, Xenobatrachus rostratus, Xenobatrachus subcroceus, Xenorhina doriae
True frogs	Platymantis papuensis, Rana daemeli, Rana grisea
Tree frogs	Litoria amboinensis, Litoria angiana, Spicicalyx eucnemis, Spicicalyx genimaculata, Litoria i. infrafrenata, Litoria micromembrana, Litoria nigropunctata, Litoria thesaurensis, Litoria wollastoni, Nyctimystes disrupta, Nyctimystes foricula, Nyctimystes kubori, Nyctimystes obsoleta, Nyctimystes pulchra
Leptodactylidae	Lechriodus aganoposis
True toad	Bufo marinus

=== Birds ===
The below table contains some of the birds commonly encountered at higher elevations along the Huon peninsula.

Birds found at higher elevations within the Huon peninsula
Scientific name	Scientific name
Psitacella brehmii	Grallina bruijni
Psitrichas fulgidus	Chaetorhynchus papuensis
Cacomantis castaneiventris	Paradisaea minor
Chrysococcyx rufcollis	P. guilielmi
Ninox rufa	Chlamydera lauterbachi
Apus pacifcus	Chlamydera cerviniventris
Coracina Montana	Melidectes ochromelas
Ptilorrhoa caerulescens	Melidectes foersteri
Ptilorrhoa leucosticta	Meliphaga Montana
Zoothera heinei	Meliphaga albonotana
Sericornis perspicillatus	Melanocharis crassirostris
Sericornis papuensis	Dicaeum geelvinkianum
Crateroscelis nigrorufa	Daphoenosita chrysoptera
Rhipidura atra	Pitohui kirhocephalus
Machaerirhynchus faviventer	Pachycephala schlegelii
Monarcha rubiensis	Amalocichla incerta
Myiagra alecto	Amalocichla sclateriana
Arses telescophthalmus	Petroica bivitata
Arses insulari	Poecilodryas albonotata
Charmosyna wilhelminae	Psiteuteles goldiei
Otidiphaps nobilis	Gallicolumba beccarii
Megapodius decollatus	Hieraaetus weiskei
Accipiter meyerianus	Accipiter melanochlamys

== Conservation ==
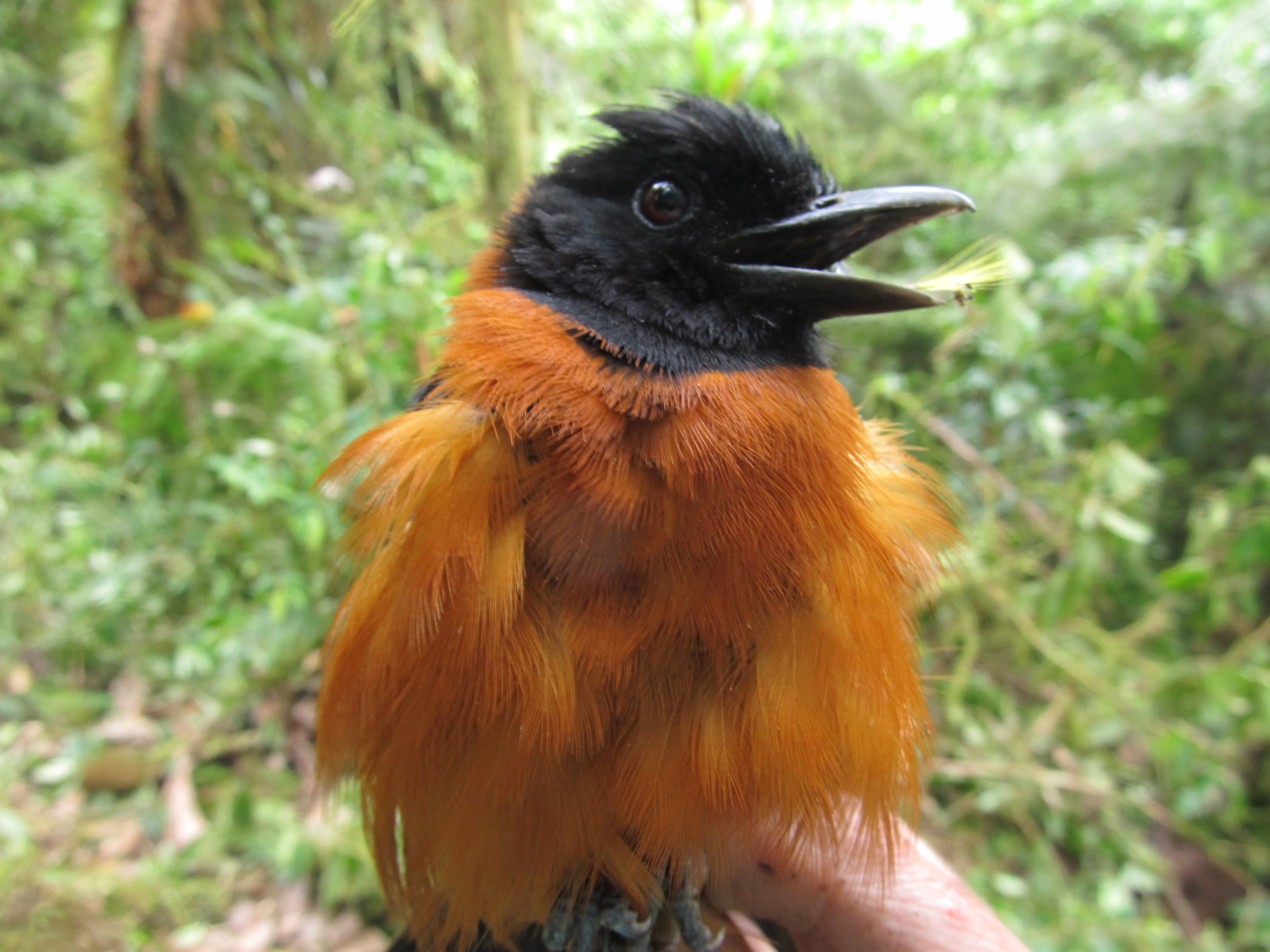
Hooded Pitohui (Pitohui dichrous) YUS Conservation area on the Huon Peninsula, Morobe Province, Papua New Guinea

The raised beach coastal terraces of Huon were added to the UNESCO World Heritage Tentative List on June 6, 2006 in the Mixed (Cultural + Natural) category.

In 2009 the YUS Conservation Area was established in the northern part of the peninsula. YUS stretches over 760 km^{2} and includes the three rivers, Yopno, Uruwa and Som, for which it was named.

== See also ==
- Huon languages
