= Sphenomorphus kinabaluensis =

Conservation status
- Least Concern (IUCN 3.1)

Scientific classification
- Kingdom: Animalia
- Phylum: Chordata
- Class: Reptilia
- Order: Squamata
- Family: Scincidae
- Genus: Sphenomorphus
- Species: S. kinabaluensis

Binomial name
- Sphenomorphus kinabaluensis (Bartlett, 1895)

Synonyms
- Lygosoma kinabaluensis Otosaurus kinabaluense

Species of lizard

Sphenomorphus kinabaluensis is a species of skink found in Malaysia, and is endemic to the Crocker Mountains in Borneo, including the area surrounding Mount Kinabalu.

== Geographic range ==
S. kinabaluensis resides in the southern part of the Crocker Mountains to southwestern Sabah, including Lumaku, Mesilau, and Sunsuron, with a possible habitat extension further south to neighbouring states of Sarawak and Kalimantan of Indonesia. The skink was also identified in Marai Parai, northwest of Mount Kinabalu.

== Taxonomy ==
S. kinabaluensis was firstly identified as Lygosoma kinabaluensis by Edward Bartlett in 1895, and also formerly described as an Otosaurus species, before its genus was reclassified as Sphenomorphus.

== Description ==
Bartlett initially described S. kinabaluensis as similar to S. variegatus, but with a mottled back with no striations, and without a distinct dorsolateral band, with Smith called it a "high altitude derivative" of S. variegatus. It was also been described as similar in shape with lowland-living S. cyanolaemus in general, but with a more elongated trunk, fewer scale rows and sub-digit lamellae.

Its head and body length is around 51 mm, with a tail length of 67 mm. Its snout is obtusely-pointed with a scaly lower eyelid, and an ear opening without lobules nearly as large as its eye-opening. S. kinabaluensis has around 32–38 midbody scale rows and 80–89 paravertebral scale rows. S. kinabaluensis has 5–6 supraocular scales, including one with parietal contact. Its lamellae is smooth, totaling to 15–17 lamellae (on the 4th toe).

== Ecology ==
S. kinabaluensis is one of the few montane Sphenomorphus species, residing on altitudes above 1,000 metres (3,300 ft).
