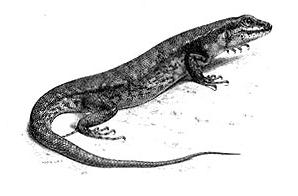
- Sphenomorphus nigrolabris

Scientific classification
- Kingdom: Animalia
- Phylum: Chordata
- Class: Reptilia
- Order: Squamata
- Family: Scincidae
- Subfamily: Sphenomorphinae
- Genus: Sphenomorphus; Fitzinger, 1843

Species
- Presently 116, but see text

Synonyms
- Hinulia Gray, 1845; Spenopmorphus [sic] (lapsus)

= Sphenomorphus =

Genus of lizards

The genus Sphenomorphus – vernacularly also known as the common skinks – currently serves as a "wastebin taxon" for numerous skinks. While most or all species presently placed here are probably rather close relatives, the genus as presently delimited is likely not to be monophyletic and needs review. Some species in this genus have been moved to Pinoyscincus.

The namesake of the Sphenomorphus group of Lygosominae genera, most species would probably occupy a rather basal position therein.

== Species ==
- Sphenomorphus acutus (W. Peters, 1864) – pointed-headed sphenomorphus
- Sphenomorphus aignanus (Boulenger, 1898)
- Sphenomorphus alfredi (Boulenger, 1898)
- Sphenomorphus annamiticus (Boettger, 1901) – Perak forest skink, starry forest skink
- Sphenomorphus annectens (Boulenger, 1897)
- Sphenomorphus anomalopus (Boulenger, 1890) – long-toed forest skink
- Sphenomorphus anotus Greer, 1973
- Sphenomorphus apalpebratus Datta-Roy, Das, Bauer, Lyngdoh-Tron & Karanth, 2013
- Sphenomorphus bacboensis (Eremchenko, 2003)
- Sphenomorphus bignelli Schmidt, 1932
- Sphenomorphus brunneus Greer & F. Parker, 1974
- Sphenomorphus buenloicus Darevsky & V.S. Nguyen, 1983
- Sphenomorphus buettikoferi (Lidth de Jeude, 1905)
- Sphenomorphus cameronicus M.A. Smith, 1924 – Cameron Highlands forest skink
- Sphenomorphus capitolythos Shea & Michels, 2008
- Sphenomorphus celebensis (F. Müller, 1894)
- Sphenomorphus cinereus Greer & F. Parker, 1974
- Sphenomorphus concinnatus (Boulenger, 1887) – elegant forest skink
- Sphenomorphus consobrinus (W. Peters & Doria, 1878)
- Sphenomorphus cophias Boulenger, 1908 – Tahan Mountain forest skink
- Sphenomorphus courcyanus (Annandale, 1912)
- Sphenomorphus cranei Schmidt, 1932 – Crane’s skink
- Sphenomorphus crassus Inger, Lian, Lakim & Yambun, 2001
- Sphenomorphus cryptotis Darevsky, Orlov & Cuc, 2004
- Sphenomorphus cyanolaemus Inger & Hosmer, 1965 – blue-headed forest skink
- Sphenomorphus darlingtoni (Loveridge, 1945)
- Sphenomorphus dekkerae Shea, 2017
- Sphenomorphus derooyae (De Jong, 1927)
- Sphenomorphus diwata W. Brown & Rabor, 1967 – diwata sphenomorphus
- Sphenomorphus dussumieri (A.M.C. Duméril & Bibron, 1839) – Dussumier's forest skink
- Sphenomorphus fasciatus (Gray, 1845) – banded sphenomorphus
- Sphenomorphus forbesi (Boulenger, 1888) – slender litter skink
- Sphenomorphus fragilis (Macleay, 1877)
- Sphenomorphus fragosus Greer & F. Parker, 1967
- Sphenomorphus fuscolineatus Greer & Shea, 2004
- Sphenomorphus grandisonae Taylor, 1962 – Grandison’s forest skink
- Sphenomorphus granulatus (Boulenger, 1903)
- Sphenomorphus haasi Inger & Hosmer, 1965
- Sphenomorphus helenae Cochran, 1927 – Notaburi forest skink
- Sphenomorphus incognitus (Thompson, 1912)
- Sphenomorphus indicus (Gray, 1853) – Indian forest skink
- Sphenomorphus jobiensis (A. Meyer, 1874)
- Sphenomorphus kinabaluensis (Bartlett, 1895)
- Sphenomorphus latifasciatus (A. Meyer, 1874)
- Sphenomorphus leptofasciatus Greer & F. Parker, 1974
- Sphenomorphus lineopunctulatus Taylor, 1962 – line-spotted forest skink
- Sphenomorphus lingnanensis'' (Guo et al., 2026)
- Sphenomorphus longicaudatus (de Rooij, 1915)
- Sphenomorphus loriae (Boulenger, 1897)
- Sphenomorphus louisiadensis (Boulenger, 1903)
- Sphenomorphus maculatus (Blyth, 1853) – spotted forest skink, maculated forest skink, stream-side skink
- Sphenomorphus maculicollus Bacon, 1967
- Sphenomorphus maindroni (Sauvage, 1879)
- Sphenomorphus malaisei (Rendahl, 1937)
- Sphenomorphus malayanus (Doria, 1888) – Malayan forest skink
- Sphenomorphus melanopogon (A.M.C. Duméril & Bibron, 1839)
- Sphenomorphus meyeri (Doria, 1874)
- Sphenomorphus microtympanum Greer, 1973
- Sphenomorphus mimicus Taylor, 1962 – dwarf forest skink
- Sphenomorphus mimikanus (Boulenger, 1914)
- Sphenomorphus minutus (A. Meyer, 1874)
- Sphenomorphus modiglianii (Boulenger, 1894)
- Sphenomorphus muelleri (Schlegel, 1837) – forest skink, Müllers Kielskink
- Sphenomorphus multisquamatus Inger, 1958
- Sphenomorphus murudensis M.A. Smith, 1925
- Sphenomorphus necopinatus (Brongersma, 1942)
- Sphenomorphus neuhaussi T. Vogt, 1911
- Sphenomorphus nigriventris (De Rooij, 1915)
- Sphenomorphus nigrolabris (Günther, 1873)
- Sphenomorphus nigrolineatus (Boulenger, 1897)
- Sphenomorphus oligolepis (Boulenger, 1914)
- Sphenomorphus orientalis (Shreve, 1940)
- Sphenomorphus papuae (Kinghorn, 1928)
- Sphenomorphus phuquocensis Grismer, Nazarov, Bobrov & Poyarkov, 2020 – Phu Quoc Island forest skink
- Sphenomorphus praesignis (Boulenger, 1900) – blotched forest skink
- Sphenomorphus pratti (Boulenger, 1903)
- Sphenomorphus preylangensis Grismer, Wood, Quah, Anuar, Poyarkov, Thy, Orlov, Thammachoti & Seiha, 2019 – Prey Lang forest skink
- Sphenomorphus puncticentralis Iskandar, 1994
- Sphenomorphus rarus C. Myers & Donnelly, 1991
- Sphenomorphus rufus (Boulenger, 1887)
- Sphenomorphus sabanus Inger, 1958 – Sabah slender skink
- Sphenomorphus sanana (Kopstein, 1926)
- Sphenomorphus sanctus (A.M.C. Duméril & Bibron, 1839) – Java forest skink
- Sphenomorphus sarasinorum (Boulenger, 1897)
- Sphenomorphus schlegeli Dunn, 1927
- Sphenomorphus schultzei (T. Vogt, 1911)
- Sphenomorphus scotophilus (Boulenger, 1900) – Selangor forest skink
- Sphenomorphus scutatus (W. Peters, 1867) – Palau ground skink
- Sphenomorphus senja Grismer & Quah, 2015
- Sphenomorphus sheai T.Q. Nguyen, K. Nguyen, Van Devender, Bonkowski & Ziegler, 2013 – Shea's forest skink
- Sphenomorphus shelfordi (Boulenger, 1900)
- Sphenomorphus simus (Sauvage, 1879) – common forest skink
- Sphenomorphus solomonis (Boulenger, 1887)
- Sphenomorphus stellatus (Boulenger, 1900) – Perak forest skink, starry forest skink
- Sphenomorphus striolatus (Weber, 1890)
- Sphenomorphus sungaicolus Sumarli, Grismer, Wood, A. Ahmad, Rizal, Ismail, Izam, N. Ahmad & Linkem, 2016
- Sphenomorphus taiwanensis Chen & Lue, 1987
- Sphenomorphus tanahtinggi Inger, Lian, Lakim & Yambun, 2001
- Sphenomorphus tanneri Greer & F. Parker, 1967 – Tanner’s skink
- Sphenomorphus taylori Burt, 1930 – Taylor’s Solomon skink
- Sphenomorphus tenuiculus (Mocquard, 1890)
- Sphenomorphus tersus (M.A. Smith, 1916) – Nakhon Si-Thammarat forest skink, Thai forest skink
- Sphenomorphus tetradactylus (Darevsky & Orlov, 2005)
- Sphenomorphus tonkinensis T.Q. Nguyen, Schmitz, T.T. Nguyen, Orlov, Böhme & Ziegler, 2011 – Tonkin forest skink
- Sphenomorphus transversus Greer & F. Parker, 1971
- Sphenomorphus tridigitus (Bourret, 1939)
- Sphenomorphus tritaeniatus (Bourret, 1937)
- Sphenomorphus tropidonotus (Boulenger, 1897)
- Sphenomorphus undulatus (W. Peters & Doria, 1878) – wavy-backed forest skink
- Sphenomorphus vanheurni (Brongersma, 1942)
- Sphenomorphus variegatus (W. Peters, 1867)
- Sphenomorphus wau Shea & Allison, 2021
- Sphenomorphus wollastoni (Boulenger, 1914)
- Sphenomorphus woodfordi (Boulenger, 1887)
- Sphenomorphus yersini S. Nguyen, L. Nguyen, V.D.H. Nguyen, Orlov & Murphy, 2018 – Yersin’s forest skink
- Sphenomorphus zimmeri (Ahl, 1933)
- Sphenomorphus tophus Grismer, Pawangkhanant, Naiduangchan, Grismer, Dugdale, Pierce, Quah, Suwannapoom & Poyarkov. 2026

"Hinulia" elegans, described by Gray in 1838, is unidentified, but may be Eulamprus tenuis, which is also known as Concinnia tenuis (Gray, 1831).

== Geographic range ==
Species of Sphenomorphus are found mainly in Southeast Asia but have also been found in India and northwards to China.
