= Sanana (disambiguation) =

Sanana is a town and administrative centre in Sula Islands Regency, North Maluku, Indonesia.

Sanana may also refer to:

- Sanana Island, an island in Indonesia
- San Sanana, a 2001 Hindi song by Alka Yagnik featuring Hema Sardesai
- Sula language, also known as Sanana, an Malayo-Polynesian language spoken in Indonesia

== See also ==
- Sphenomorphus sanana, a species of skink found in Indonesia
