= Senja (disambiguation) =

Senja may refer to:

== Places ==
- Senja, an island in Troms county, Norway
- Senja Municipality, a municipality in Troms county, Norway
- Senja, Singapore, a residential town located in the West Region of Singapore

== People ==
- Senja Mäkitörmä (born 1994), a Finnish athlete
- Senja Pusula (born 1941), a former cross-country skier from Finland

== Other ==
- Senja (genre), an Indonesian indie-folk genre
- Senja LRT station, an LRT station on the Bukit Panjang LRT line in Singapore
- Senja Troll, a tourist attraction in Finnsæter on the island of Senja in northern Norway
- Senja prosti, a deanery within the Church of Norway in Troms county, Norway
- FK Senja, an association football club from Siland, Norway
- Senja, a given name related to Xenia
- Senja di Jakarta, an Indonesian novel written by Mochtar Lubis
- Sphenomorphus senja, a species of skink from Malaysia
- Senja Rutebil, a bus company based in Finnsnes, Norway
- Senja District Court, a district court in Troms county, Norway

== See also ==
- Pipiet Senja, pseudonym of Etty Hadiwati Arief (1957–2025), Indonesian author
