= Cameron Highlands forest skink =

There are two species of skink named Cameron Highlands forest skink, both endemic to Malaysia:

- Sphenomorphus cameronicus
- Tytthoscincus jaripendek
