= Sphenomorphus tanneri =

Conservation status
- Least Concern (IUCN 3.1)

Scientific classification
- Kingdom: Animalia
- Phylum: Chordata
- Class: Reptilia
- Order: Squamata
- Suborder: Scinciformata
- Infraorder: Scincomorpha
- Family: Sphenomorphidae
- Genus: Sphenomorphus
- Species: S. tanneri

Binomial name
- Sphenomorphus tanneri Greer & Parker, 1967

Species of lizard

Sphenomorphus tanneri, Tanner's skink, is a species of skink found in the Solomon Islands, New Britain, and the Bismarck archipelago.
