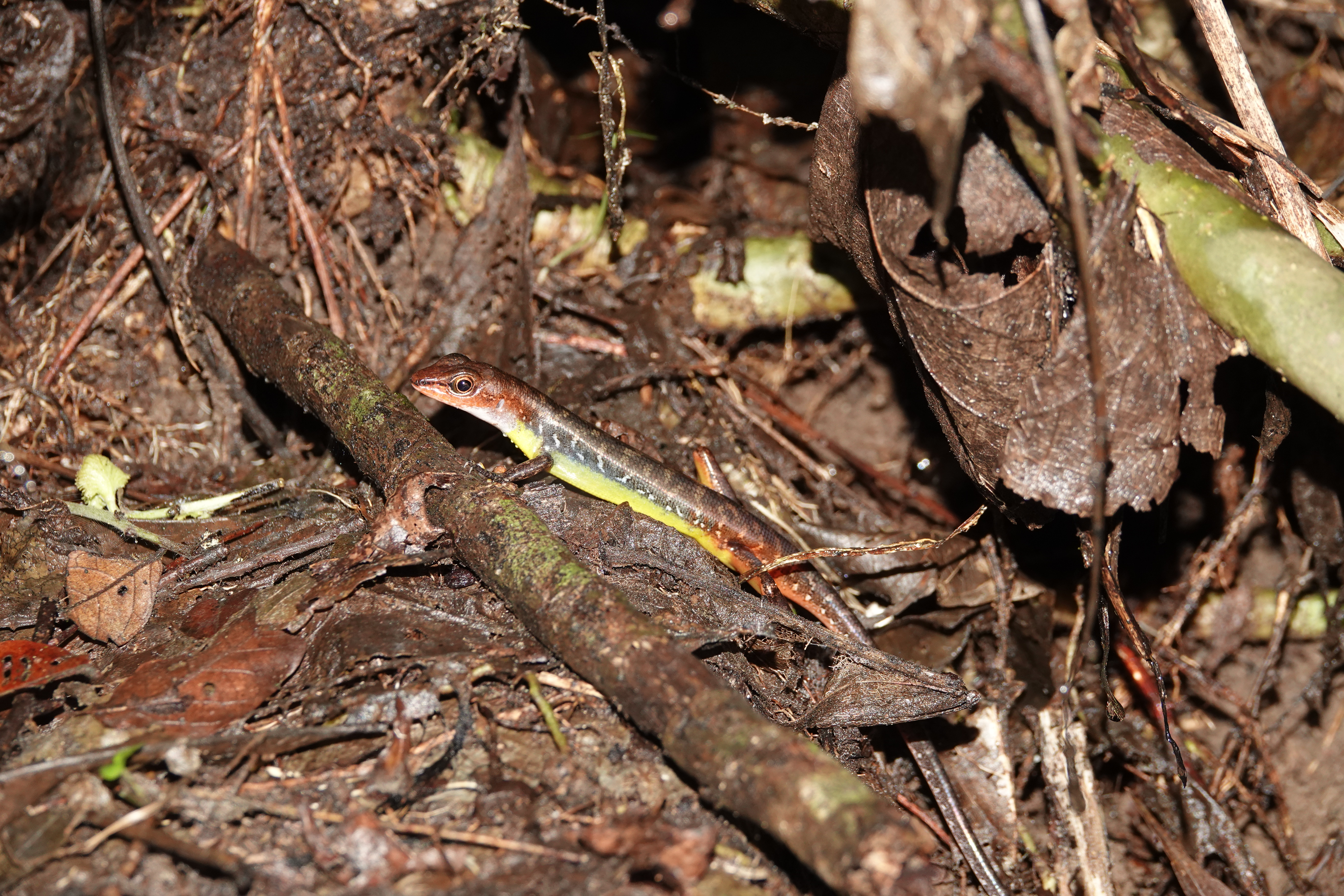

Conservation status
- Data Deficient (IUCN 3.1)

Scientific classification
- Kingdom: Animalia
- Phylum: Chordata
- Class: Reptilia
- Order: Squamata
- Family: Scincidae
- Genus: Sphenomorphus
- Species: S. anomalopus

Binomial name
- Sphenomorphus anomalopus (Boulenger, 1890)

= Sphenomorphus anomalopus =

Species of lizard

The long-toed forest skink (Sphenomorphus anomalopus) is a species of skink found in Malaysia and Indonesia (Nias, Sumatra, Pinang) which can be identified by an extended/elongated fourth hind foot.

== Etymology ==
Presumably from the Greek anomalos (strange) plus pous (foot). The description emphasizes the abnormal hind foot, with extended toes with strongly keeled lamellae, and a lack of granules on the sole (replaced by imbricate scales).

== Rediscovery ==
Very little is known about the species, with just a handful of records, and none between 1915 and 2025, when it was rediscovered in Sumatra during a two-day trek made by Pablo Sinovas.

This rediscovery also shed light on the species' “vibrant and contrasting” colouration, micro-habitat and natural history, which had remained a mystery for over a century following its original description. According to observations made in situ in Gunung Leuser National Park, the species inhabits the rain forest floor and, contrary to previous hypothesis, is not arboreal.
