= Sphenomorphus vanheurni =

Scientific classification
- Kingdom: Animalia
- Phylum: Chordata
- Class: Reptilia
- Order: Squamata
- Family: Scincidae
- Genus: Sphenomorphus
- Species: S. vanheurni

Binomial name
- Sphenomorphus vanheurni (Brongersma, 1942)

Synonyms
- Lygosoma (Sphenomorphus) vanheurni Brongersma, 1942

Species of lizard

Sphenomorphus vanheurni is a species of skink. It is found in Java and Bali, Indonesia.
