= Sphenomorphus scotophilus =

Conservation status
- Least Concern (IUCN 3.1)

Scientific classification
- Kingdom: Animalia
- Phylum: Chordata
- Class: Reptilia
- Order: Squamata
- Suborder: Scinciformata
- Infraorder: Scincomorpha
- Family: Sphenomorphidae
- Genus: Sphenomorphus
- Species: S. scotophilus

Binomial name
- Sphenomorphus scotophilus (Boulenger, 1900)

Species of lizard

Sphenomorphus scotophilus, the Selangor forest skink, is a species of skink found in Thailand, Sumatra, and Malaysia.
