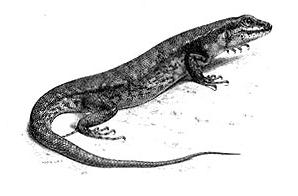

Scientific classification
- Domain: Eukaryota
- Kingdom: Animalia
- Phylum: Chordata
- Class: Reptilia
- Order: Squamata
- Family: Scincidae
- Genus: Sphenomorphus
- Species: S. nigrolabris

Binomial name
- Sphenomorphus nigrolabris (Günther, 1873)

= Sphenomorphus nigrolabris =

Species of lizard

Sphenomorphus nigrolabris is a species of skink found in Indonesia.
