= Sphenomorphus rufus =

Conservation status
- Data Deficient (IUCN 3.1)

Scientific classification
- Kingdom: Animalia
- Phylum: Chordata
- Class: Reptilia
- Order: Squamata
- Suborder: Scinciformata
- Infraorder: Scincomorpha
- Family: Sphenomorphidae
- Genus: Sphenomorphus
- Species: S. rufus

Binomial name
- Sphenomorphus rufus (Boulenger, 1887)

Species of lizard

Sphenomorphus rufus is a species of skink found in Indonesia.
