= Sphenomorphus malaisei =

Scientific classification
- Domain: Eukaryota
- Kingdom: Animalia
- Phylum: Chordata
- Class: Reptilia
- Order: Squamata
- Family: Scincidae
- Genus: Sphenomorphus
- Species: S. malaisei

Binomial name
- Sphenomorphus malaisei (Rendahl, 1937)

Synonyms
- Lygosoma malaisei Rendahl, 1937

Species of lizard

Sphenomorphus malaisei is a species of skink found in Myanmar. It is only known from the type specimen which was collected in early 1900s.
