= Sphenomorphus diwata =

Conservation status
- Data Deficient (IUCN 3.1)

Scientific classification
- Kingdom: Animalia
- Phylum: Chordata
- Class: Reptilia
- Order: Squamata
- Family: Scincidae
- Genus: Sphenomorphus
- Species: S. diwata

Binomial name
- Sphenomorphus diwata Brown & Rabor, 1967

Species of lizard

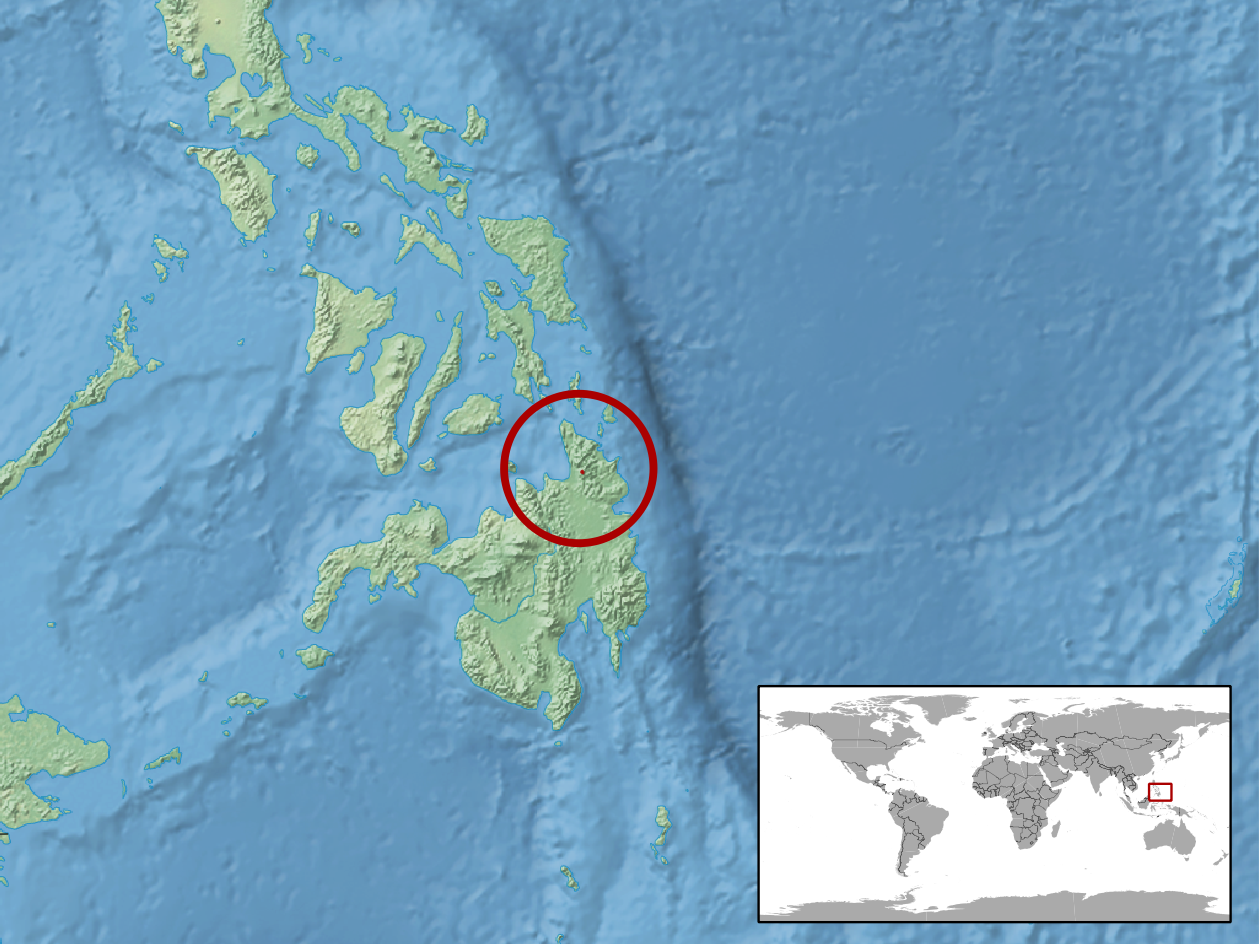
geographic distribution of Sphenomorphus diwata

The diwata sphenomorphus (Sphenomorphus diwata) is a species of skink found in the Philippines.
