= Sphenomorphus wau =

Scientific classification
- Kingdom: Animalia
- Phylum: Chordata
- Class: Reptilia
- Order: Squamata
- Family: Scincidae
- Genus: Sphenomorphus
- Species: S. wau

Binomial name
- Sphenomorphus wau Shea & Allison, 2021

Species of lizard

Sphenomorphus wau is a species of skink found in Papua New Guinea.
