= Sphenomorphus tanahtinggi =

Conservation status
- Data Deficient (IUCN 3.1)

Scientific classification
- Kingdom: Animalia
- Phylum: Chordata
- Class: Reptilia
- Order: Squamata
- Family: Scincidae
- Genus: Sphenomorphus
- Species: S. tanahtinggi

Binomial name
- Sphenomorphus tanahtinggi Inger, Lian, Lakim, & Yambun, 2001

Species of lizard

Sphenomorphus tanahtinggi is a species of skink found in Malaysia.
