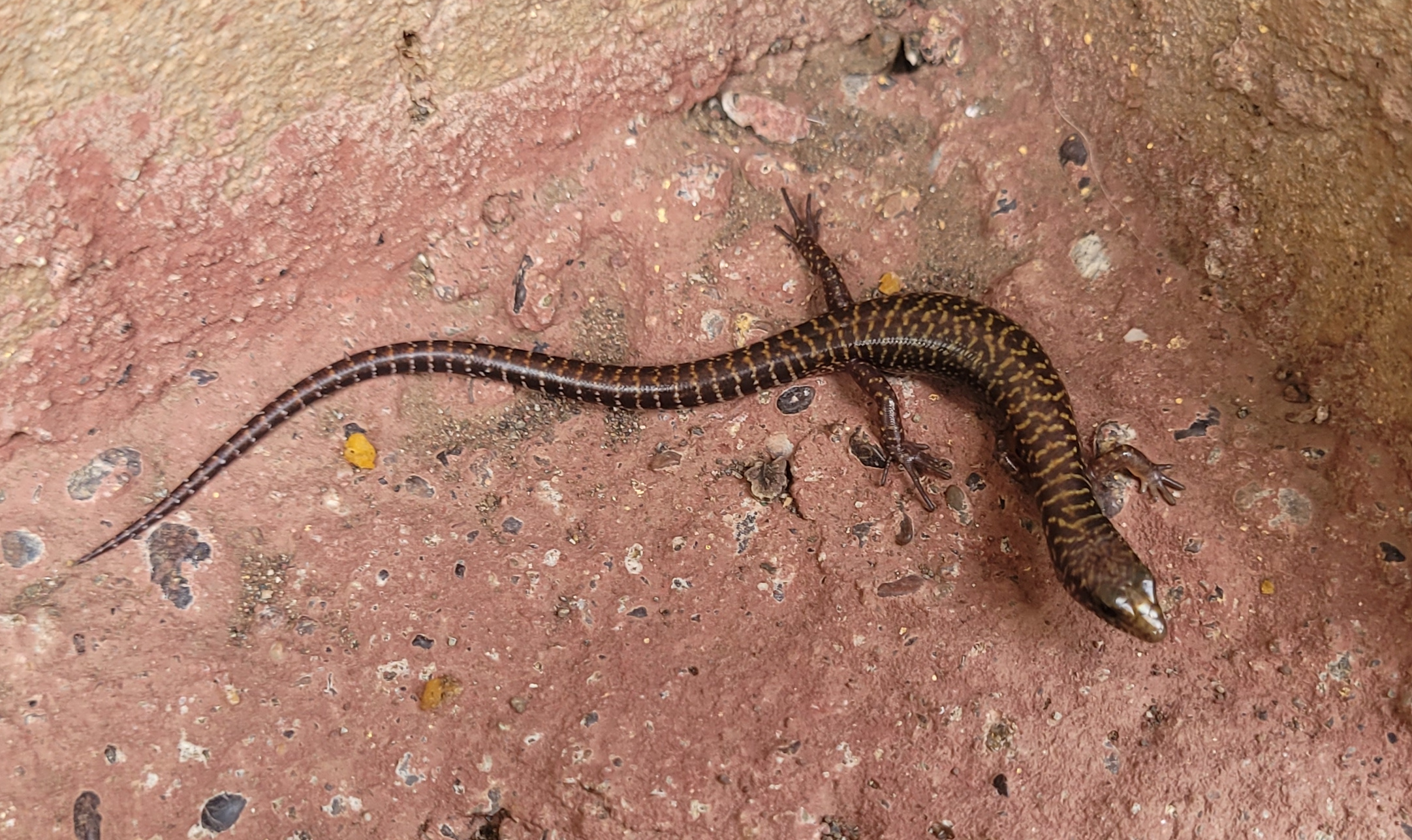
- Sphenomorphus fasciatus from Bukidnon, Mindanao, Philippines

Conservation status
- Least Concern (IUCN 3.1)

Scientific classification
- Kingdom: Animalia
- Phylum: Chordata
- Class: Reptilia
- Order: Squamata
- Family: Scincidae
- Genus: Sphenomorphus
- Species: S. fasciatus

Binomial name
- Sphenomorphus fasciatus (Gray, 1845)
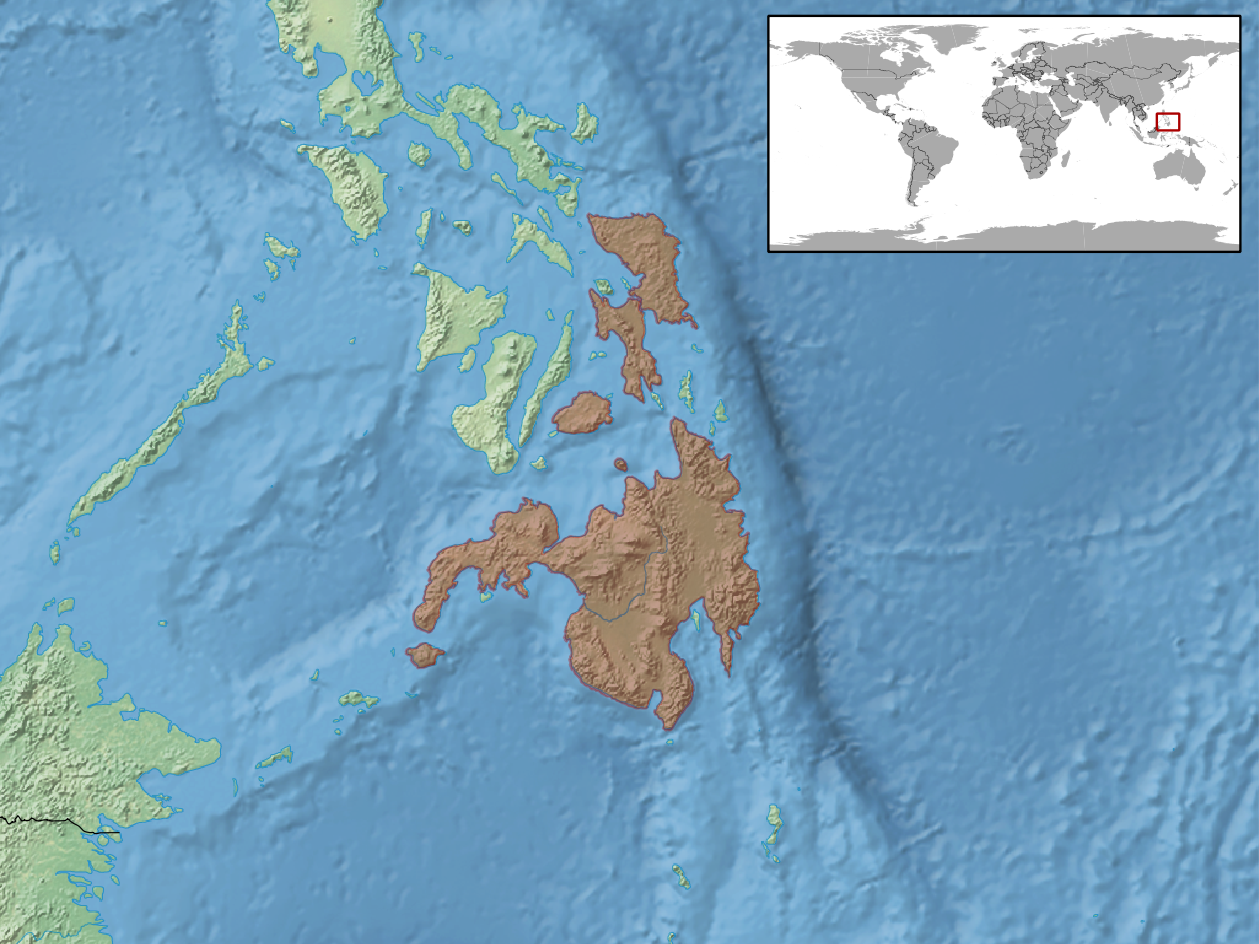

Synonyms
- Hinulia fasciata Gray, 1845

= Sphenomorphus fasciatus =

Banded sphenomorphus

Species of lizard

Sphenomorphus fasciatus , the banded sphenomorphus, is a species of skink endemic to the Philippines. It is oviparous and grows to about 70 mm (2.8 in) in snout–vent length.

== Habitat and conservation ==
It is a common species occurring in dipterocarp and Babeee submontane forests at elevations to 1,200 m (3,900 ft) above sea level. Habitat loss can be a local threat, but the overall population is not threatened; it occurs in many protected areas.
