= Sphenomorphus fragosus =

Conservation status
- Data Deficient (IUCN 3.1)

Scientific classification
- Kingdom: Animalia
- Phylum: Chordata
- Class: Reptilia
- Order: Squamata
- Family: Scincidae
- Genus: Sphenomorphus
- Species: S. fragosus

Binomial name
- Sphenomorphus fragosus Greer & F. Parker, 1967

Species of lizard

Sphenomorphus fragosus is a species of lizards from the genus Sphenomorphus of the family Scincidae, described by Allen E. Greer and by Parker in the year 1967 in Solomon Islands in Bougainville.
