= Sphenomorphus bignelli =

Conservation status
- Least Concern (IUCN 3.1)

Scientific classification
- Kingdom: Animalia
- Phylum: Chordata
- Class: Reptilia
- Order: Squamata
- Family: Scincidae
- Genus: Sphenomorphus
- Species: S. bignelli

Binomial name
- Sphenomorphus bignelli Schmidt, 1932

Species of lizard

Sphenomorphus bignelli is a species of skink, a lizard in the family Scincidae. The species is endemic to the Solomon Islands.

== Etymology ==
The specific name, bignelli, is in honor of Charles Robert Bignell (1892–1964), who was a planter in the Solomon Islands.

== Habitat ==
The preferred natural habitat of S. bignelli is forest, at altitudes of 150–1,500 m (490–4,920 ft).

== Description ==
A small species for its genus, S. bignelli is dark reddish brown dorsally, and it is pale yellow ventrally. The holotype has a snout-to-vent length (SVL) of 3.3 cm (1.3 in) and a total length of 6.8 cm (2.7 in).

== Behavior ==
S. bignelli is diurnal and terrestrial. It is not fossorial, but does hide in leaf litter and under fallen logs.

== Diet ==
S. bignelli preys upon insects and their larvae.

== Reproduction ==
The mode of reproduction of S. bignelli is unknown.
