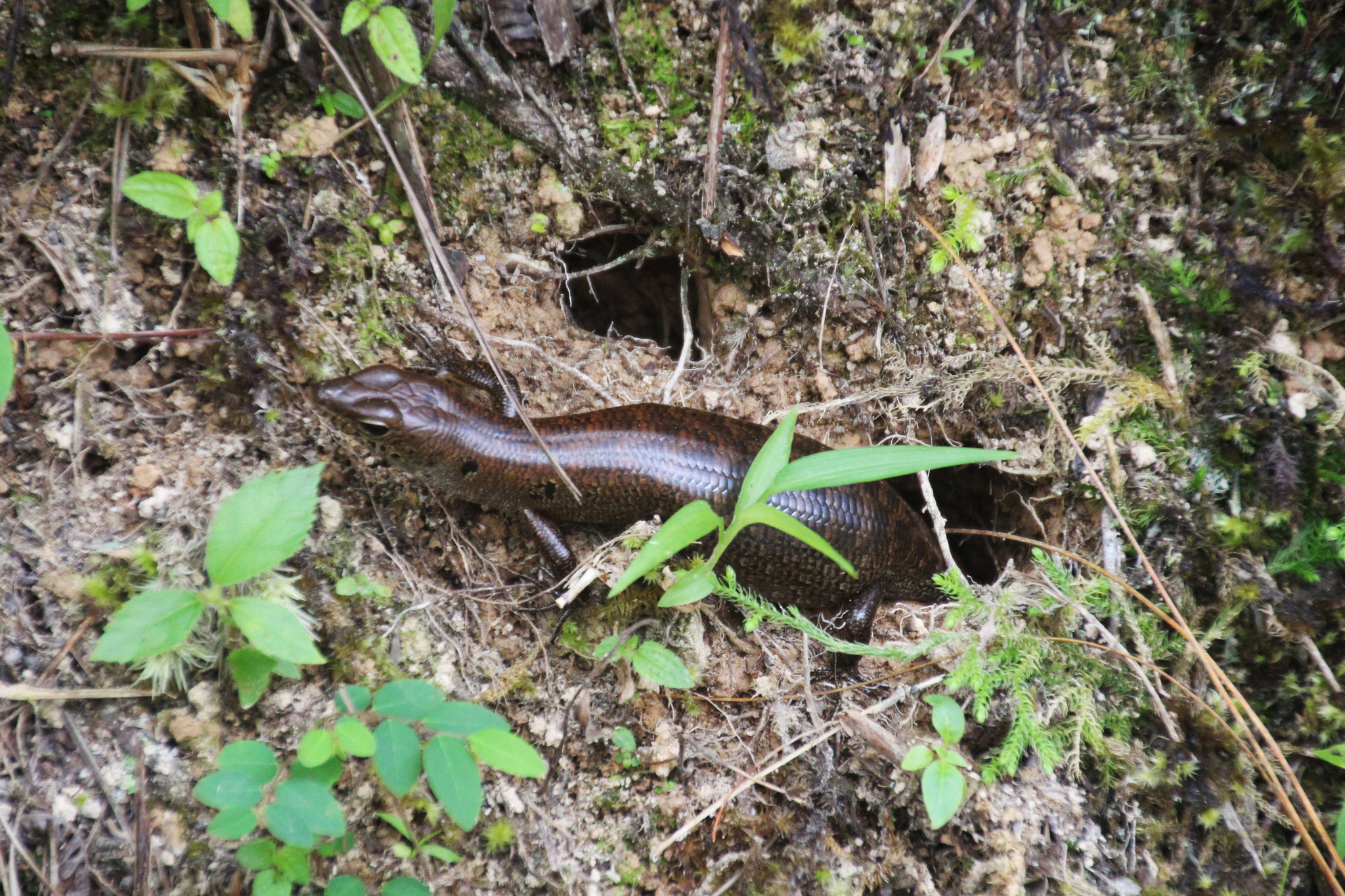

Conservation status
- Least Concern (IUCN 3.1)

Scientific classification
- Kingdom: Animalia
- Phylum: Chordata
- Class: Reptilia
- Order: Squamata
- Suborder: Scinciformata
- Infraorder: Scincomorpha
- Family: Sphenomorphidae
- Genus: Sphenomorphus
- Species: S. praesignis

Binomial name
- Sphenomorphus praesignis (Boulenger, 1900)

= Sphenomorphus praesignis =

Species of lizard

The blotched forest skink (Sphenomorphus praesignis) is a species of skink found in Thailand and Malaysia.
