= Sphenomorphus undulatus =

Conservation status
- Least Concern (IUCN 3.1)

Scientific classification
- Kingdom: Animalia
- Phylum: Chordata
- Class: Reptilia
- Order: Squamata
- Suborder: Scinciformata
- Infraorder: Scincomorpha
- Family: Sphenomorphidae
- Genus: Sphenomorphus
- Species: S. undulatus

Binomial name
- Sphenomorphus undulatus (Peters & Doria, 1878)

Species of lizard

Sphenomorphus undulatus, the wavy-backed forest skink, is a species of skink found in Indonesia.
