= Sphenomorphus consobrinus =

Scientific classification
- Kingdom: Animalia
- Phylum: Chordata
- Order: Squamata
- Family: Scincidae
- Genus: Sphenomorphus
- Species: S. consobrinus

Binomial name
- Sphenomorphus consobrinus (Peters & Doria, 1878)

Species of lizard

Sphenomorphus consobrinus is a species of skink found in Indonesia.
