= Sphenomorphus cophias =

Conservation status
- Data Deficient (IUCN 3.1)

Scientific classification
- Kingdom: Animalia
- Phylum: Chordata
- Class: Reptilia
- Order: Squamata
- Family: Scincidae
- Genus: Sphenomorphus
- Species: S. cophias

Binomial name
- Sphenomorphus cophias (Boulenger, 1908)

Synonyms
- Tytthoscincus cophias Boulenger, 1908; Lygosoma cophias (Boulenger, 1908)

Species of lizard

Sphenomorphus cophias, the Tahan Mountain forest skink, is a species of skink. It is endemic to the Banjaran Timur mountains in Pahang, Peninsular Malaysia.
