= Sphenomorphus phuquocensis =

Scientific classification
- Kingdom: Animalia
- Phylum: Chordata
- Class: Reptilia
- Order: Squamata
- Family: Scincidae
- Genus: Sphenomorphus
- Species: S. phuquocensis

Binomial name
- Sphenomorphus phuquocensis Grismer, Nazarov, Bobrov, & Poyarkov, 2020

Species of lizard

The Phu Quoc Island forest skink (Sphenomorphus phuquocensis) is a species of skink found in Vietnam.
