= Sphenomorphus tonkinensis =

Conservation status
- Least Concern (IUCN 3.1)

Scientific classification
- Kingdom: Animalia
- Phylum: Chordata
- Class: Reptilia
- Order: Squamata
- Family: Scincidae
- Genus: Sphenomorphus
- Species: S. tonkinensis

Binomial name
- Sphenomorphus tonkinensis Nguyen, Schmitz, Nguyen, Orlov, Böhme, & Ziegler, 2011

Species of lizard

Sphenomorphus tonkinensis, the Tonkin forest skink, is a species of skink found in Vietnam.
