= Sphenomorphus apalpebratus =

Scientific classification
- Kingdom: Animalia
- Phylum: Chordata
- Class: Reptilia
- Order: Squamata
- Family: Scincidae
- Genus: Sphenomorphus
- Species: S. apalpebratus

Binomial name
- Sphenomorphus apalpebratus Datta-Roy, Das, Bauer, Lyngdoh-Tron, & Karanth, 2013

Species of lizard

Sphenomorphus apalpebratus is a species of skink found in India.
