= Sphenomorphus courcyanus =

Scientific classification
- Kingdom: Animalia
- Phylum: Chordata
- Class: Reptilia
- Order: Squamata
- Family: Scincidae
- Genus: Sphenomorphus
- Species: S. courcyanus

Binomial name
- Sphenomorphus courcyanus (Annandale, 1912)

Species of lizard

Sphenomorphus courcyanus is a species of skink found in Asia.

== Distribution ==
India (Assam), China (S Xizang = Tibet) Type locality: Rotung, N. Assam
