= Sphenomorphus cinereus =

Scientific classification
- Domain: Eukaryota
- Kingdom: Animalia
- Phylum: Chordata
- Class: Reptilia
- Order: Squamata
- Family: Scincidae
- Genus: Sphenomorphus
- Species: S. cinereus

Binomial name
- Sphenomorphus cinereus Greer & Parker, 1974

Species of lizard

Sphenomorphus cinereus is a species of skink found in Papua New Guinea.
