= Sphenomorphus preylangensis =

Scientific classification
- Kingdom: Animalia
- Phylum: Chordata
- Class: Reptilia
- Order: Squamata
- Family: Scincidae
- Genus: Sphenomorphus
- Species: S. preylangensis

Binomial name
- Sphenomorphus preylangensis Grismer, Wood, Quah, Anuar, Poyarkov, Thy, Orlov, Thammachoti, & Seiha, 2019

Species of lizard

The Prey Lang forest skink (Sphenomorphus preylangensis) is a species of skink found in Cambodia.
