= Sphenomorphus maculicollus =

Conservation status
- Data Deficient (IUCN 3.1)

Scientific classification
- Kingdom: Animalia
- Phylum: Chordata
- Class: Reptilia
- Order: Squamata
- Family: Scincidae
- Genus: Sphenomorphus
- Species: S. maculicollus

Binomial name
- Sphenomorphus maculicollus Bacon, 1967

Species of lizard

Sphenomorphus maculicollus is a species of skink. It is found in Malaysia.
