= Sphenomorphus transversus =

Conservation status
- Data Deficient (IUCN 3.1)

Scientific classification
- Kingdom: Animalia
- Phylum: Chordata
- Class: Reptilia
- Order: Squamata
- Suborder: Scinciformata
- Infraorder: Scincomorpha
- Family: Sphenomorphidae
- Genus: Sphenomorphus
- Species: S. transversus

Binomial name
- Sphenomorphus transversus Greer & Parker, 1971

Species of lizard

Sphenomorphus transversus is a species of skink found in the Solomon Islands.
