= Sphenomorphus sungaicolus =

Conservation status
- Least Concern (IUCN 3.1)

Scientific classification
- Kingdom: Animalia
- Phylum: Chordata
- Class: Reptilia
- Order: Squamata
- Family: Scincidae
- Genus: Sphenomorphus
- Species: S. sungaicolus

Binomial name
- Sphenomorphus sungaicolus Sumarli, Grismer, Wood, Ahmad, Rizal, Ismail, Izam, Ahmad, & Linkem, 2016

Species of lizard

Sphenomorphus sungaicolus is a species of skink found in Malaysia.
