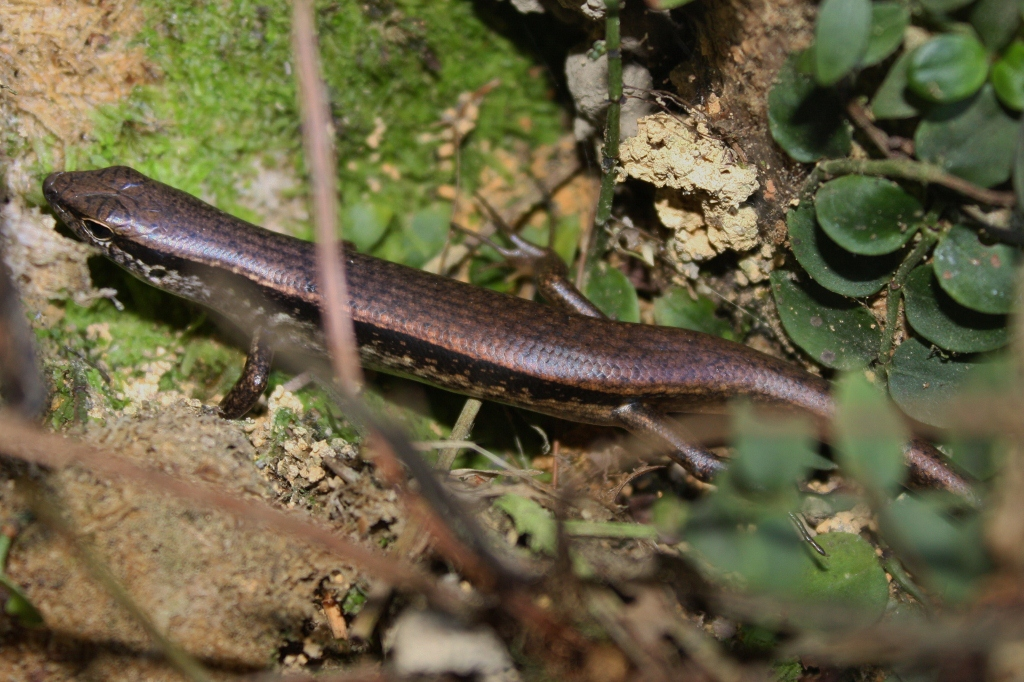

Conservation status
- Least Concern (IUCN 3.1)

Scientific classification
- Kingdom: Animalia
- Phylum: Chordata
- Class: Reptilia
- Order: Squamata
- Family: Scincidae
- Genus: Sphenomorphus
- Species: S. incognitus

Binomial name
- Sphenomorphus incognitus (Thompson, 1912)

Synonyms
- Lygosoma incognita Thompson, 1912; Sphenomorphus boulengeri Van Denburgh, 1912; Lygosoma boulengeri (Van Denburgh, 1912); Sphenomorphus leveretti Schmidt, 1925

= Sphenomorphus incognitus =

Species of lizard

Sphenomorphus incognitus is a species of skink. It is found in southern China (including Hainan), Taiwan, and northern Vietnam. It measures about 77 mm (3.0 in) in snout–vent length.
