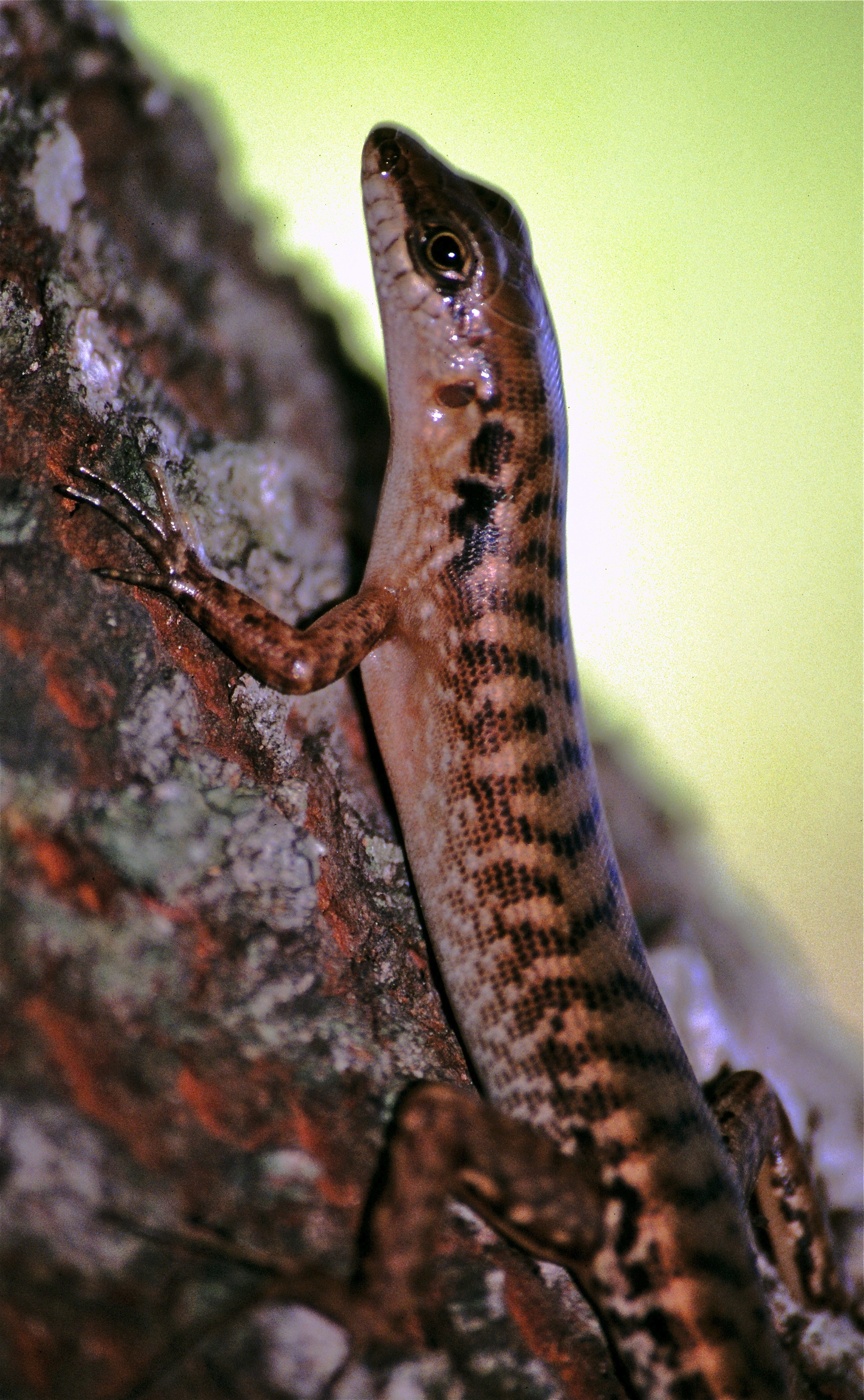

Scientific classification
- Domain: Eukaryota
- Kingdom: Animalia
- Phylum: Chordata
- Class: Reptilia
- Order: Squamata
- Family: Scincidae
- Genus: Sphenomorphus
- Species: S. striolatus

Binomial name
- Sphenomorphus striolatus (Weber, 1890)

= Sphenomorphus striolatus =

Species of lizard

Sphenomorphus striolatus is a species of skink found in Indonesia.
