= Sphenomorphus latifasciatus =

Conservation status
- Least Concern (IUCN 3.1)

Scientific classification
- Kingdom: Animalia
- Phylum: Chordata
- Class: Reptilia
- Order: Squamata
- Family: Scincidae
- Genus: Sphenomorphus
- Species: S. latifasciatus

Binomial name
- Sphenomorphus latifasciatus (Meyer, 1874)

Species of lizard

Sphenomorphus latifasciatus is a species of skink. It is found in Indonesia.
