= Sphenomorphus tropidonotus =

Conservation status
- Endangered (IUCN 3.1)

Scientific classification
- Kingdom: Animalia
- Phylum: Chordata
- Class: Reptilia
- Order: Squamata
- Suborder: Scinciformata
- Infraorder: Scincomorpha
- Family: Sphenomorphidae
- Genus: Sphenomorphus
- Species: S. tropidonotus

Binomial name
- Sphenomorphus tropidonotus (Boulenger, 1897)

Species of lizard

Sphenomorphus tropidonotus is a species of skink found in Indonesia.
