= Sphenomorphus tridigitus =

Conservation status
- Near Threatened (IUCN 3.1)

Scientific classification
- Kingdom: Animalia
- Phylum: Chordata
- Class: Reptilia
- Order: Squamata
- Family: Scincidae
- Genus: Sphenomorphus
- Species: S. tridigitus

Binomial name
- Sphenomorphus tridigitus (Bourret, 1939)

Species of lizard

Sphenomorphus tridigitus is a species of skink found in Laos and Vietnam.
