= Sphenomorphus puncticentralis =

Scientific classification
- Kingdom: Animalia
- Phylum: Chordata
- Class: Reptilia
- Order: Squamata
- Family: Scincidae
- Genus: Sphenomorphus
- Species: S. puncticentralis

Binomial name
- Sphenomorphus puncticentralis Iskandar, 1994

Species of lizard

Sphenomorphus puncticentralis is a species of skink found in Indonesia.
