= Sphenomorphus taiwanensis =

Scientific classification
- Kingdom: Animalia
- Phylum: Chordata
- Class: Reptilia
- Order: Squamata
- Family: Scincidae
- Genus: Sphenomorphus
- Species: S. taiwanensis

Binomial name
- Sphenomorphus taiwanensis Chen & Lue, 1987

Species of lizard

Sphenomorphus taiwanensis is a species of skink. It is endemic to Taiwan and is common in areas above 1,800 m (5,900 ft) asl.
