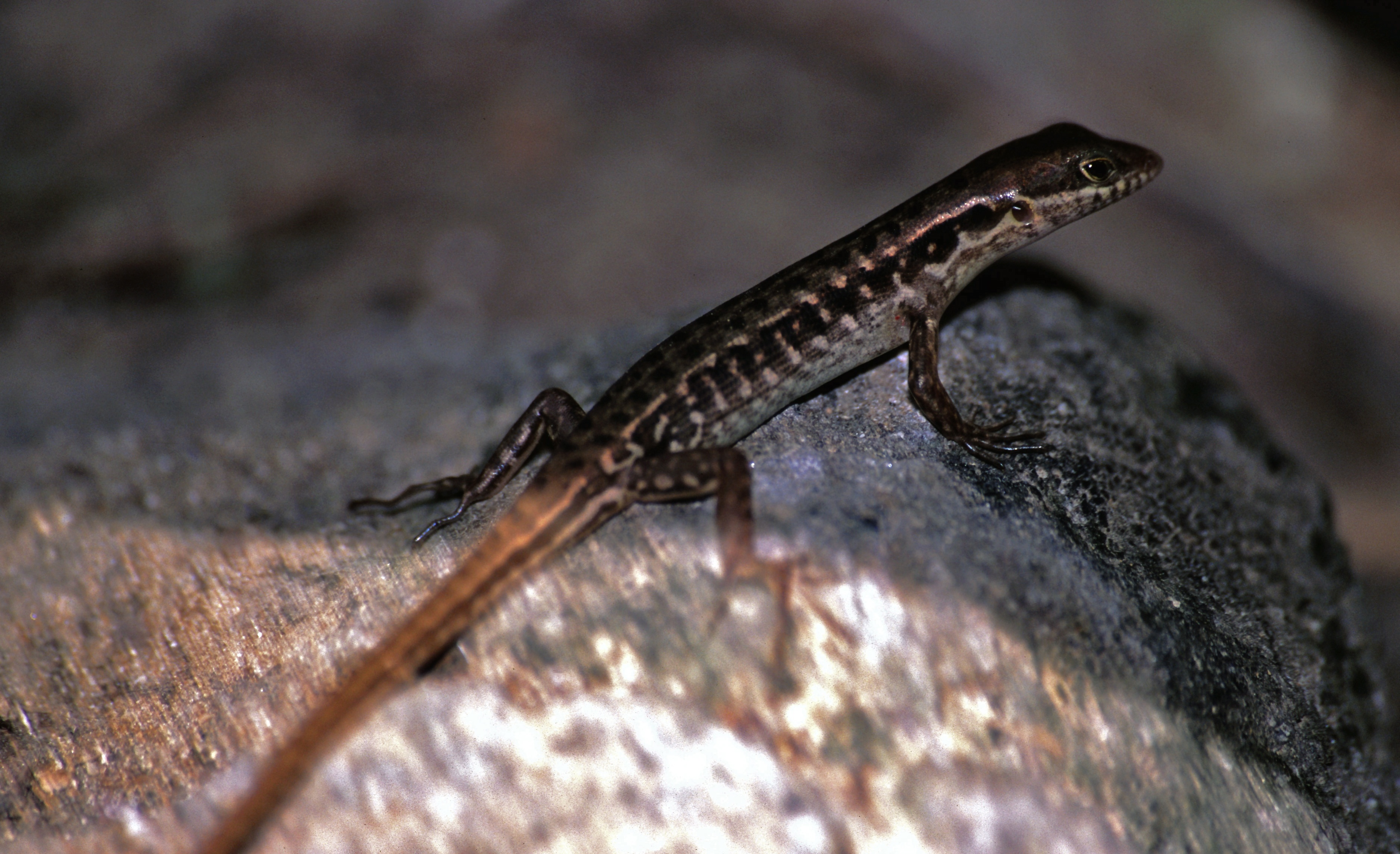

Conservation status
- Least Concern (IUCN 3.1)

Scientific classification
- Kingdom: Animalia
- Phylum: Chordata
- Class: Reptilia
- Order: Squamata
- Family: Scincidae
- Genus: Sphenomorphus
- Species: S. melanopogon

Binomial name
- Sphenomorphus melanopogon (A.M.C. Duméril & Bibron, 1839)

= Sphenomorphus melanopogon =

Species of lizard

Sphenomorphus melanopogon is a species of skink found in Indonesia.
