= Sphenomorphus bacboensis =

Conservation status
- Data Deficient (IUCN 3.1)

Scientific classification
- Kingdom: Animalia
- Phylum: Chordata
- Class: Reptilia
- Order: Squamata
- Family: Scincidae
- Genus: Sphenomorphus
- Species: S. bacboensis

Binomial name
- Sphenomorphus bacboensis (Eremchenko, 2003)

Species of lizard

Sphenomorphus bacboensis is a species of skink found in Vietnam.
