= Fojia =

Conservation status
- Data Deficient (IUCN 3.1)

Scientific classification
- Kingdom: Animalia
- Phylum: Chordata
- Class: Reptilia
- Order: Squamata
- Family: Scincidae
- Genus: Fojia; Greer & Simon, 1982
- Species: F. bumui

Binomial name
- Fojia bumui Greer & Simon, 1982

Genus of lizards

Fojia is a monotypic genus of skinks: the sole species is Fojia bumui, also known as the fojia skink. It is endemic to New Guinea where it is restricted to the Morobe Province on the northern coast of Papua New Guinea.
