= Sphenomorphus concinnatus =

Conservation status
- Least Concern (IUCN 3.1)

Scientific classification
- Kingdom: Animalia
- Phylum: Chordata
- Class: Reptilia
- Order: Squamata
- Suborder: Scinciformata
- Infraorder: Scincomorpha
- Family: Sphenomorphidae
- Genus: Sphenomorphus
- Species: S. concinnatus

Binomial name
- Sphenomorphus concinnatus (Boulenger, 1887)

Species of lizard

The elegant forest skink (Sphenomorphus concinnatus) is a species of skink found in Bougainville.
