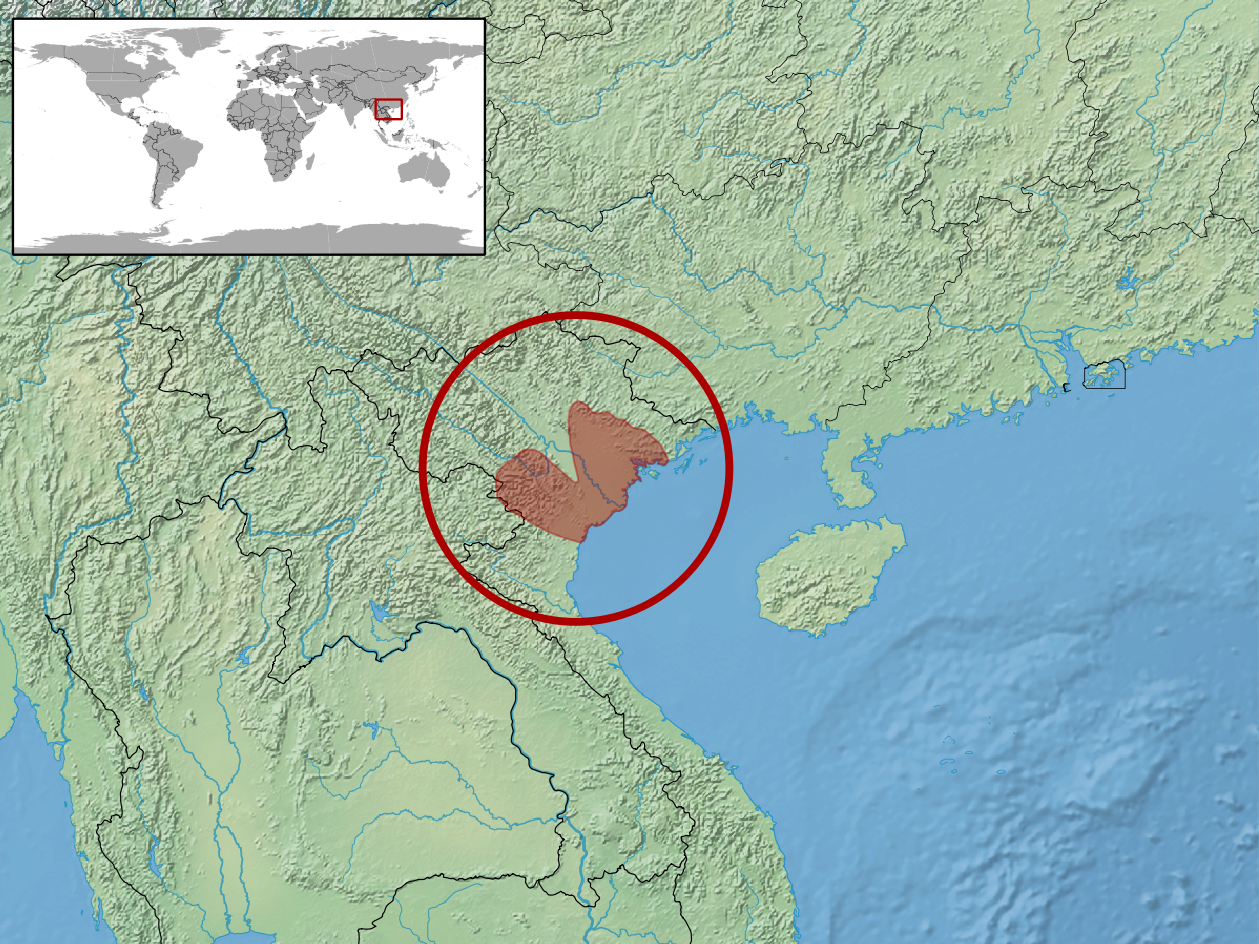
- Geographic distribution of Sphenomorphus tritaeniatus

Conservation status
- Near Threatened (IUCN 3.1)

Scientific classification
- Kingdom: Animalia
- Phylum: Chordata
- Class: Reptilia
- Order: Squamata
- Family: Scincidae
- Genus: Sphenomorphus
- Species: S. tritaeniatus

Binomial name
- Sphenomorphus tritaeniatus (Bourret, 1937)

= Sphenomorphus tritaeniatus =

Species of lizard

Sphenomorphus tritaeniatus is a species of skink found in Vietnam.
