= Sphenomorphus tersus =

Conservation status
- Least Concern (IUCN 3.1)

Scientific classification
- Kingdom: Animalia
- Phylum: Chordata
- Class: Reptilia
- Order: Squamata
- Family: Scincidae
- Genus: Sphenomorphus
- Species: S. tersus

Binomial name
- Sphenomorphus tersus (Smith, 1916)

Species of lizard

Sphenomorphus tersus, the Nakhon Si-Thammarat forest skink or Thai forest skink, is a species of skink found in Thailand and Malaysia.
