= Sphenomorphus malayanus =

Scientific classification
- Kingdom: Animalia
- Phylum: Chordata
- Class: Reptilia
- Order: Squamata
- Family: Scincidae
- Genus: Sphenomorphus
- Species: S. malayanus

Binomial name
- Sphenomorphus malayanus (Doria 1888)

Species of lizard

The Malayan forest skink (Sphenomorphus malayanus) is a species of skink. It is found in Indonesia, Malaysia, and Vietnam.
