= Sphenomorphus buenloicus =

Conservation status
- Least Concern (IUCN 3.1)

Scientific classification
- Kingdom: Animalia
- Phylum: Chordata
- Class: Reptilia
- Order: Squamata
- Family: Scincidae
- Genus: Sphenomorphus
- Species: S. buenloicus

Binomial name
- Sphenomorphus buenloicus Darevsky & Nguyen Van Sang, 1983

Species of lizard

Sphenomorphus buenloicus is a species of skink found in Vietnam.
