= Sphenomorphus grandisonae =

Conservation status
- Data Deficient (IUCN 3.1)

Scientific classification
- Kingdom: Animalia
- Phylum: Chordata
- Class: Reptilia
- Order: Squamata
- Family: Scincidae
- Genus: Sphenomorphus
- Species: S. grandisonae

Binomial name
- Sphenomorphus grandisonae Taylor, 1962

Species of lizard

Sphenomorphus grandisonae, also known commonly as Grandison's forest skink, is a species of lizard in the family Scincidae. The species is endemic to Thailand.

== Etymology ==
The specific name, grandisonae, is in honor of British herpetologist Alice Georgie Cruickshank "Bunty" Grandison.

== Geographic range ==
S. grandisonae is found in northern Thailand, in Uttaradit province.

== Habitat ==
The preferred natural habitat of S. grandisonae is forest.

== Reproduction ==
The mode of reproduction of S. grandisonae is unknown.
