= Sphenomorphus orientalis =

Scientific classification
- Domain: Eukaryota
- Kingdom: Animalia
- Phylum: Chordata
- Class: Reptilia
- Order: Squamata
- Family: Scincidae
- Genus: Sphenomorphus
- Species: S. orientalis

Binomial name
- Sphenomorphus orientalis (Shreve, 1940)

Species of lizard

Sphenomorphus orientalis is a species of skink found in Myanmar.
