= Sphenomorphus cryptotis =

Conservation status
- Least Concern (IUCN 3.1)

Scientific classification
- Kingdom: Animalia
- Phylum: Chordata
- Class: Reptilia
- Order: Squamata
- Family: Scincidae
- Genus: Sphenomorphus
- Species: S. cryptotis

Binomial name
- Sphenomorphus cryptotis Darevsky, Orlov, & Cuc, 2004

Species of lizard

Sphenomorphus cryptotis is a species of skink found in Vietnam.
