= Sphenomorphus tetradactylus =

Conservation status
- Least Concern (IUCN 3.1)

Scientific classification
- Kingdom: Animalia
- Phylum: Chordata
- Class: Reptilia
- Order: Squamata
- Family: Scincidae
- Genus: Sphenomorphus
- Species: S. tetradactylus

Binomial name
- Sphenomorphus tetradactylus (Darevsky & Orlov, 2005)

Species of lizard

Sphenomorphus tetradactylus is a species of skink found in Vietnam.
