= Sphenomorphus sheai =

Conservation status
- Data Deficient (IUCN 3.1)

Scientific classification
- Kingdom: Animalia
- Phylum: Chordata
- Class: Reptilia
- Order: Squamata
- Family: Scincidae
- Genus: Sphenomorphus
- Species: S. sheai

Binomial name
- Sphenomorphus sheai Nguyen, Nguyen, Van Devender, Bonkowski, & Ziegler, 2013

Species of lizard

Sphenomorphus sheai, Shea's forest skink, is a species of skink found in Vietnam.
