= Sphenomorphus acutus =

Conservation status
- Least Concern (IUCN 3.1)

Scientific classification
- Kingdom: Animalia
- Phylum: Chordata
- Class: Reptilia
- Order: Squamata
- Suborder: Scinciformata
- Infraorder: Scincomorpha
- Family: Sphenomorphidae
- Genus: Sphenomorphus
- Species: S. acutus

Binomial name
- Sphenomorphus acutus (Peters, 1864)

Species of lizard

The pointed-headed sphenomorphus (Sphenomorphus acutus) is a species of skink found in the Philippines.
