= Sphenomorphus lineopunctulatus =

Conservation status
- Least Concern (IUCN 3.1)

Scientific classification
- Kingdom: Animalia
- Phylum: Chordata
- Class: Reptilia
- Order: Squamata
- Family: Scincidae
- Genus: Sphenomorphus
- Species: S. lineopunctulatus

Binomial name
- Sphenomorphus lineopunctulatus Taylor, 1962

Species of lizard

Sphenomorphus lineopunctulatus, line-spotted forest skink, is a species of skink. It is found in Thailand, Cambodia, and Laos.
