= Sphenomorphus mimicus =

Conservation status
- Data Deficient (IUCN 3.1)

Scientific classification
- Kingdom: Animalia
- Phylum: Chordata
- Class: Reptilia
- Order: Squamata
- Family: Scincidae
- Genus: Sphenomorphus
- Species: S. mimicus

Binomial name
- Sphenomorphus mimicus Taylor, 1962

Species of lizard

Sphenomorphus mimicus, the dwarf forest skink, is a species of skink. It is found in Thailand and Vietnam.
