= Sphenomorphus necopinatus =

Scientific classification
- Kingdom: Animalia
- Phylum: Chordata
- Class: Reptilia
- Order: Squamata
- Family: Scincidae
- Genus: Sphenomorphus
- Species: S. necopinatus

Binomial name
- Sphenomorphus necopinatus (Brongersma, 1942)

Synonyms
- Lygosoma (Sphenomorphus) necopinatum Brongersma, 1942

Species of lizard

Sphenomorphus necopinatus is a species of skink. It is endemic to the island of Java, Indonesia.

Two subspecies are recognized:

- Sphenomorphus necopinatus necopinatus (Brongersma, 1942)
- Sphenomorphus necopinatus garutensis (Brongersma, 1942)
