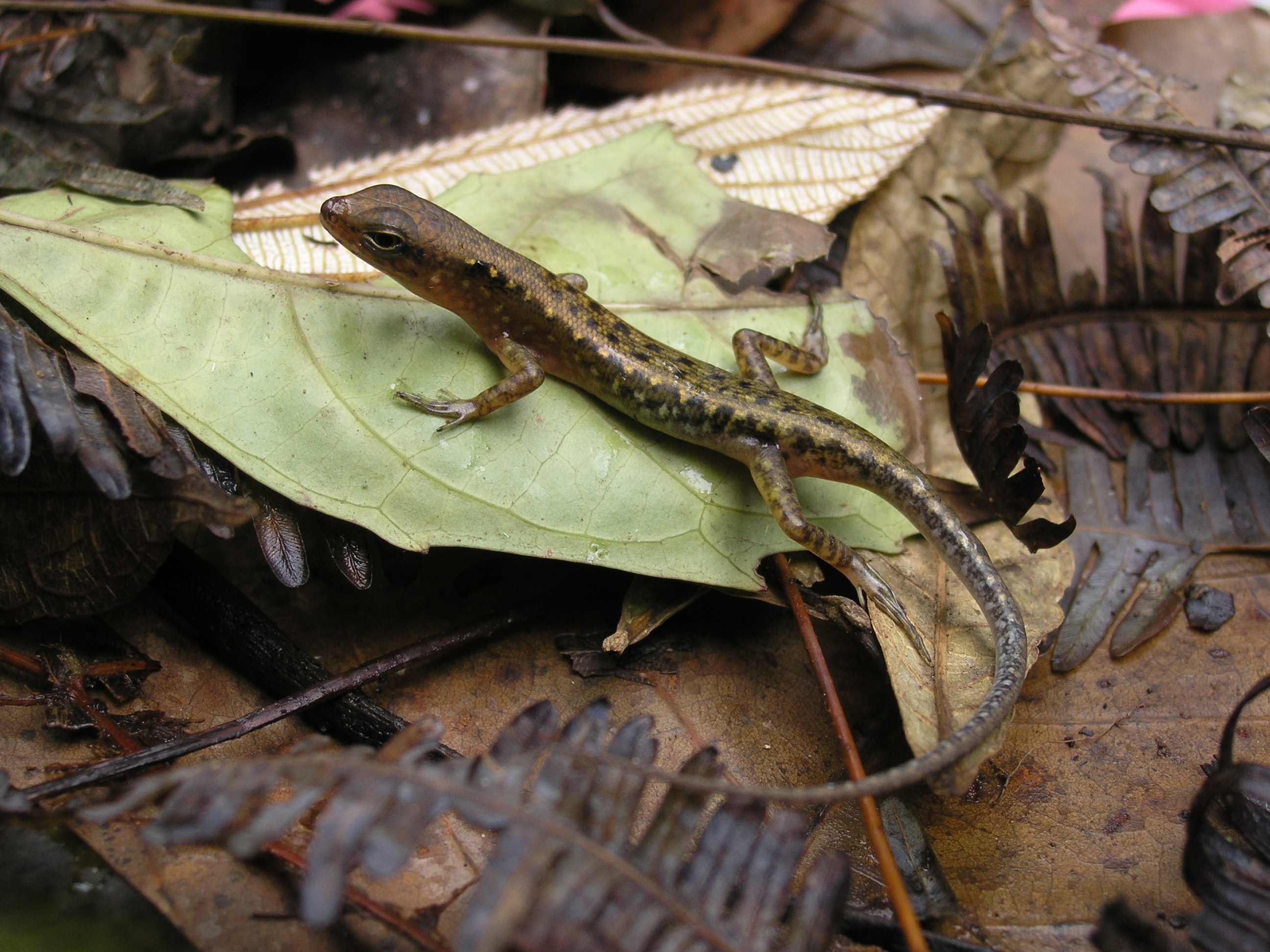

Scientific classification
- Kingdom: Animalia
- Phylum: Chordata
- Class: Reptilia
- Order: Squamata
- Family: Scincidae
- Genus: Sphenomorphus
- Species: S. variegatus

Binomial name
- Sphenomorphus variegatus (Peters, 1867)

Synonyms
- Lygosoma variegatum Otosaurus variegatum

= Sphenomorphus variegatus =

Species of lizard

Sphenomorphus variegatus is a species of skink. It is found throughout most of the Philippines, and in some parts of Malaysia (Borneo) and Indonesia (Sulawesi).
