= Sphenomorphus sanana =

Scientific classification
- Domain: Eukaryota
- Kingdom: Animalia
- Phylum: Chordata
- Class: Reptilia
- Order: Squamata
- Family: Scincidae
- Genus: Sphenomorphus
- Species: S. sanana

Binomial name
- Sphenomorphus sanana (Kopstein, 1926)

Species of lizard

Sphenomorphus sanana is a species of skink found in Indonesia.
