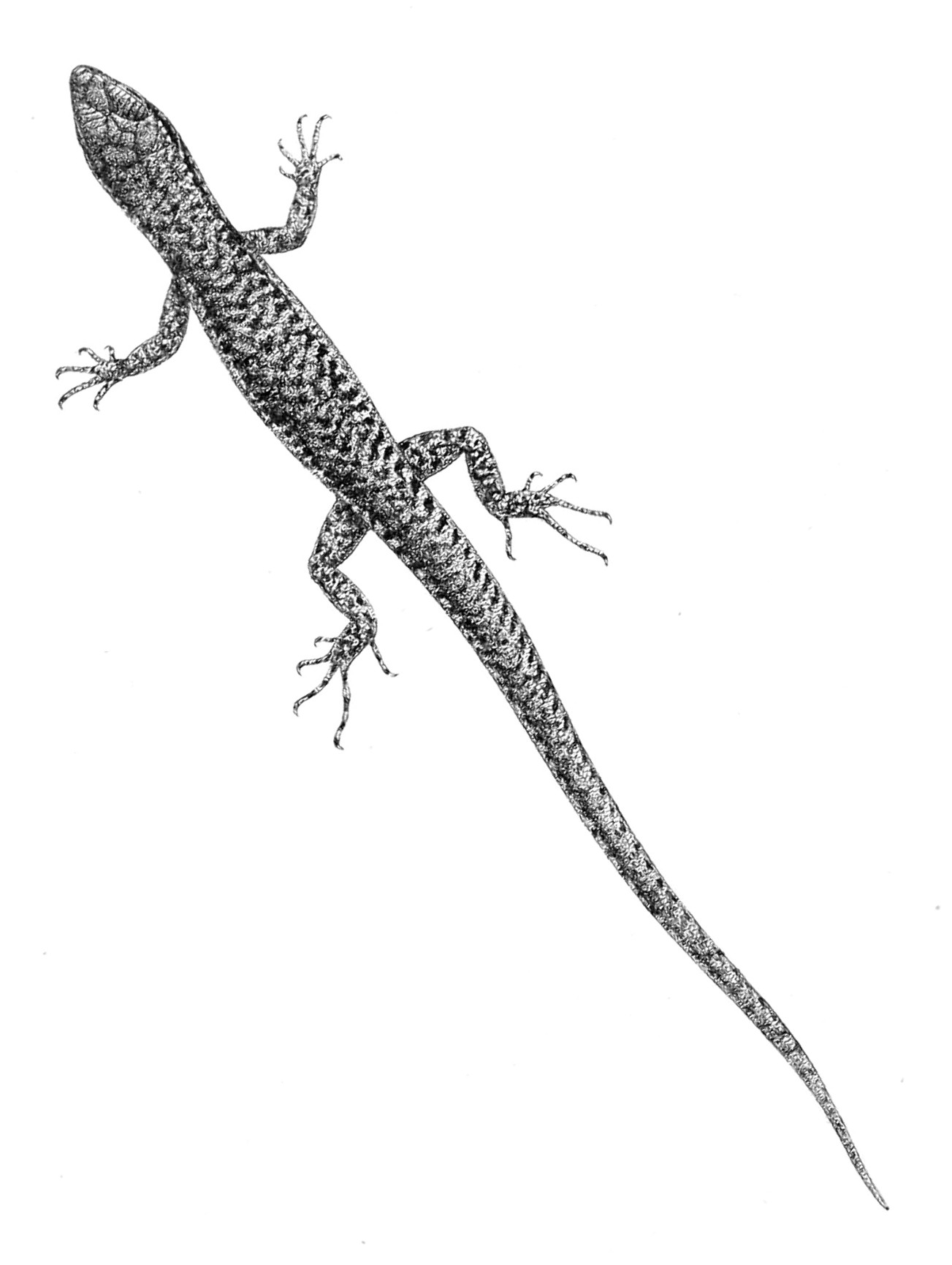

Scientific classification
- Kingdom: Animalia
- Phylum: Chordata
- Class: Reptilia
- Order: Squamata
- Family: Scincidae
- Genus: Sphenomorphus
- Species: S. annectens

Binomial name
- Sphenomorphus annectens Boulenger, 1897

Synonyms
- Otosaurus annectens Smith, 1937; Lygosoma (parotosaurus) annectens De, 1915; Lygosoma annectens Boulenger, 1897

= Sphenomorphus annectens =

Species of lizard

Sphenomorphus annectens is a species of lizard in the genus Sphenomorphus of the family Scincidae, described by George Albert Boulenger in 1897. According to Catalogue of Life Sphenomorphus annectens does not have known subspecies.
