= Sphenomorphus fragilis =

Conservation status
- Least Concern (IUCN 3.1)

Scientific classification
- Kingdom: Animalia
- Phylum: Chordata
- Class: Reptilia
- Order: Squamata
- Suborder: Scinciformata
- Infraorder: Scincomorpha
- Family: Sphenomorphidae
- Genus: Sphenomorphus
- Species: S. fragilis

Binomial name
- Sphenomorphus fragilis (Macleay, 1877)

Species of lizard

Sphenomorphus fragilis is a species of skink found in Papua New Guinea.
