= Sphenomorphus senja =

Conservation status
- Data Deficient (IUCN 3.1)

Scientific classification
- Kingdom: Animalia
- Phylum: Chordata
- Class: Reptilia
- Order: Squamata
- Family: Scincidae
- Genus: Sphenomorphus
- Species: S. senja

Binomial name
- Sphenomorphus senja Grismer & Quah, 2015

Species of lizard

Sphenomorphus senja is a species of skink found in Malaysia.
