= Sphenomorphus neuhaussi =

Conservation status
- Least Concern (IUCN 3.1)

Scientific classification
- Kingdom: Animalia
- Phylum: Chordata
- Class: Reptilia
- Order: Squamata
- Family: Scincidae
- Genus: Sphenomorphus
- Species: S. neuhaussi

Binomial name
- Sphenomorphus neuhaussi (T. Vogt, 1911)

Synonyms
- Lygosoma neuhaussi T. Vogt, 1911

Species of lizard

Sphenomorphus neuhaussi is a species of lizard in the subfamily Sphenomorphinae of the family Scincidae (skinks). The species is endemic to New Guinea

== Etymology ==
The specific name, neuhaussi, is in honor of German anthropologist Richard Neuhauss.

== Geographic distribution ==
Sphenomorphus neuhaussi occurs in the provinces of Chimbu, Eastern Highlands, Madang, and Morobe of Papua New Guinea.

== Habitat ==
The preferred natural habitat of Sphenomorphus neuhaussi is forest, at elevations from sea level to 1,800 m (5,900 ft).

== Reproduction ==
The mode of reproduction of Sphenomorphus neuhaussi is unknown.
