= Sphenomorphus solomonis =

Scientific classification
- Domain: Eukaryota
- Kingdom: Animalia
- Phylum: Chordata
- Class: Reptilia
- Order: Squamata
- Family: Scincidae
- Genus: Sphenomorphus
- Species: S. solomonis

Binomial name
- Sphenomorphus solomonis (Boulenger, 1887)

Species of lizard

Sphenomorphus solomonis is a species of skink found in the Admiralty Islands, the northern Moluccas, the Solomon Islands, New Guinea, and the Bismarck archipelago.
