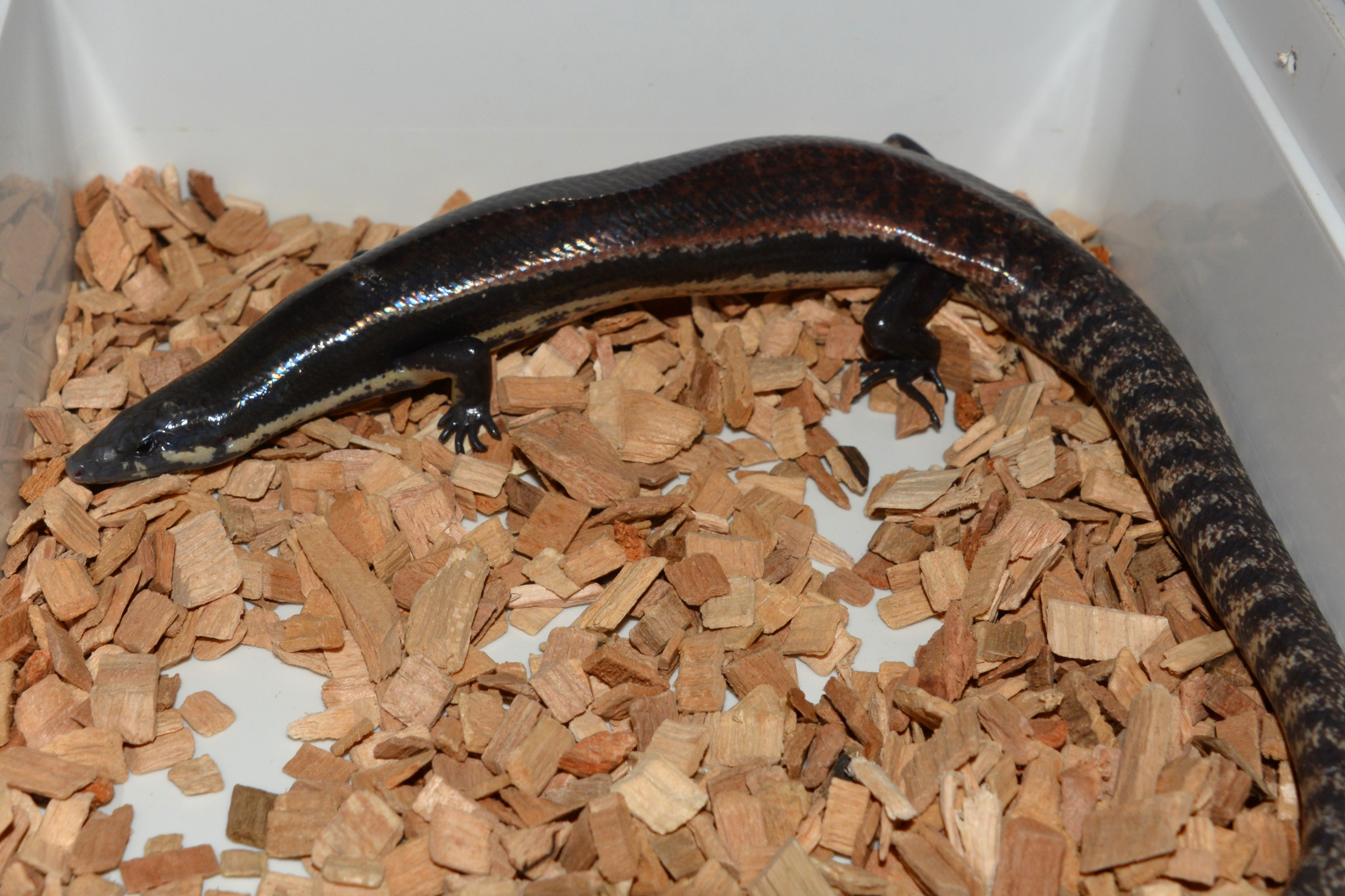

Conservation status
- Least Concern (IUCN 3.1)

Scientific classification
- Kingdom: Animalia
- Phylum: Chordata
- Class: Reptilia
- Order: Squamata
- Family: Scincidae
- Genus: Sphenomorphus
- Species: S. muelleri

Binomial name
- Sphenomorphus muelleri (Schlegel, 1837)

Synonyms
- Scincus muelleri Schlegel, 1837; Elania muelleri (Schlegel, 1837); Lygosoma muelleri (Schlegel, 1837); Lygosoma (Ictiscincus) muelleri (Schlegel, 1837); Homolepida englishi De Vis, 1890

= Sphenomorphus muelleri =

Species of lizard

Sphenomorphus muelleri, also known commonly as Mueller's skink and Müllers Keilskink in German, is a species of lizard in the subfamily Sphenomorphinae of the family Scincidae. The species is native to Indonesia.

== Etymology ==
The specific name, muelleri, is in honor of German naturalist Salomon Müller.

== Description ==
Sphenomorphus muelleri may attain a snout-to-vent length (SVL) of 15 cm (5.9 in) and a total length (tail included) of 42 cm (17 in).

== Habitat ==
The preferred natural habitat of Sphenomorphus muelleri is forest, at elevations from sea level to 200 m (660 ft).

== Behavior ==
Sphenomorphus muelleri is terrestrial, fossorial, diurnal, and crepuscular.

== Diet ==
Sphenomorphus muelleri preys upon earthworms.

== Reproduction ==
Sphenomorphus muelleri is oviparous.

== Taxonomy ==
Sphenomorphus muelleri is the type species of the genus Sphenomorphus.
