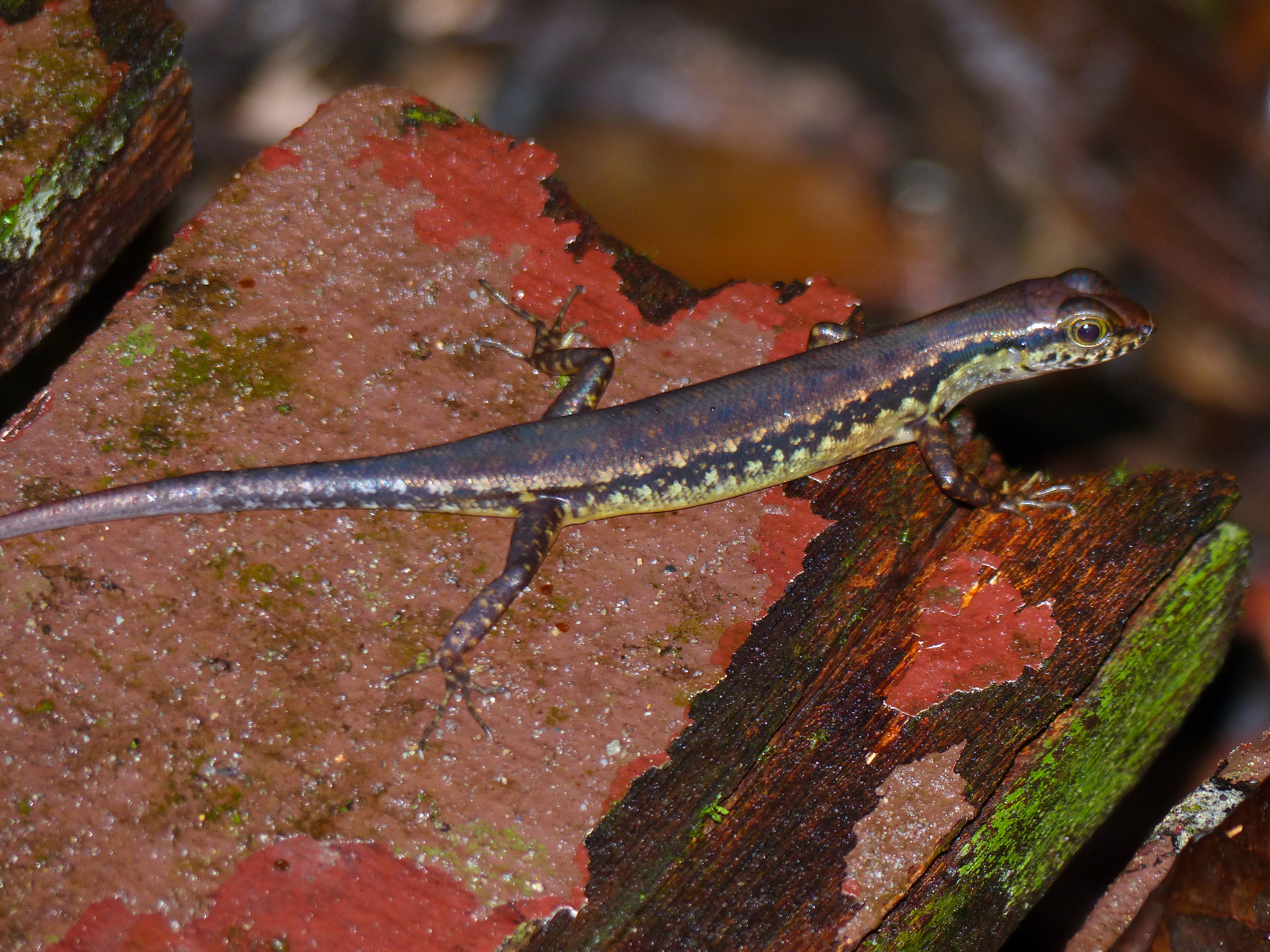

Conservation status
- Least Concern (IUCN 3.1)

Scientific classification
- Kingdom: Animalia
- Phylum: Chordata
- Class: Reptilia
- Order: Squamata
- Family: Scincidae
- Genus: Sphenomorphus
- Species: S. cyanolaemus

Binomial name
- Sphenomorphus cyanolaemus Inger & Hosmer, 1965

= Sphenomorphus cyanolaemus =

Species of lizard

The blue-headed forest skink (Sphenomorphus cyanolaemus) is a species of skink. It is found in Borneo, Peninsular Malaysia, and Sumatra (including some nearby islands).
