= Cyrtodactylus tanim =

Scientific classification
- Kingdom: Animalia
- Phylum: Chordata
- Class: Reptilia
- Order: Squamata
- Suborder: Gekkota
- Family: Gekkonidae
- Genus: Cyrtodactylus
- Species: C. tanim

Binomial name
- Cyrtodactylus tanim Nielsen & Oliver, 2017

Species of lizard

Cyrtodactylus tanim is a species of gecko that is endemic to Papua New Guinea.
