= Sphenomorphus aignanus =

Scientific classification
- Domain: Eukaryota
- Kingdom: Animalia
- Phylum: Chordata
- Class: Reptilia
- Order: Squamata
- Family: Scincidae
- Genus: Sphenomorphus
- Species: S. aignanus

Binomial name
- Sphenomorphus aignanus (Boulenger, 1898)

Species of lizard

Sphenomorphus aignanus is a species of skink found in Papua New Guinea.
