= Edward Bartlett =

English ornithologist and herpetologist

Edward Bartlett (1836 – April 1908) was an English ornithologist and herpetologist. He was the son of Abraham Dee Bartlett.

Bartlett accompanied Henry Baker Tristram to Palestine in 1863–64, and collected in the Amazon basin and Peru in 1865–69. He was curator at the Maidstone Museum from 1875 to 1890, and curator of the Sarawak Museum from 1893 to 1897.

One of his most notable publications, though uncompleted at the time of his death, was his "Monograph of the Weaver Birds (Ploceidae) and Arboreal and Terrestrial Finches ", of which five parts were published in 1888–89.

His most notable herpetological publication, "The Crocodiles and Lizards of Borneo in the Sarawak Museum, with Descriptions of Supposed New Species and the Variation of Colours in the Several Species during Life ", was published in 1895.

Species named after Bartlett include Bartlett's tinamou Crypturellus bartletti of Peru - the name being assigned in 1873 by fellow British ornithologists Philip Lutley Sclater and Osbert Salvin.

== Honours ==
- 1889 - elected a Corresponding Member of the American Ornithologists' Union
- 1897 - elected a Fellow of the Zoological Society of London
