= Allen Eddy Greer =

Australian herpetologist

- Born: 20th century
- Education: Harvard University
- Known for: Taxonomy of Australian and Oceanian reptiles
- Scientific career
- Fields: Herpetology
- Workplaces: Australian Museum
- Doctoral advisor: Ernest Edward Williams

Allen Eddy Greer is an Australian herpetologist. He is a senior scientist at the Australian Museum in Sydney.

Greer received his PhD in 1973 under the supervision of Ernest Edward Williams at the Museum of Comparative Zoology of Harvard University. In 1974–75, he was an assistant curator in the Herpetology Department at the Museum of Vertebrate Zoology at the University of California, Berkeley, before joining the Australian Museum.

Greer is credited with the original descriptions of 62 species of reptiles. Among them is the genus Eremiascincus, which he described in 1979. The genus is commonly known as the night skinks.

== Publications ==
- The Biology and Evolution of Australian Snakes. Surrey Beatty & Sons, 1997.
- Encyclopedia of Australian Reptiles. Australian Museum Online, 2005.
