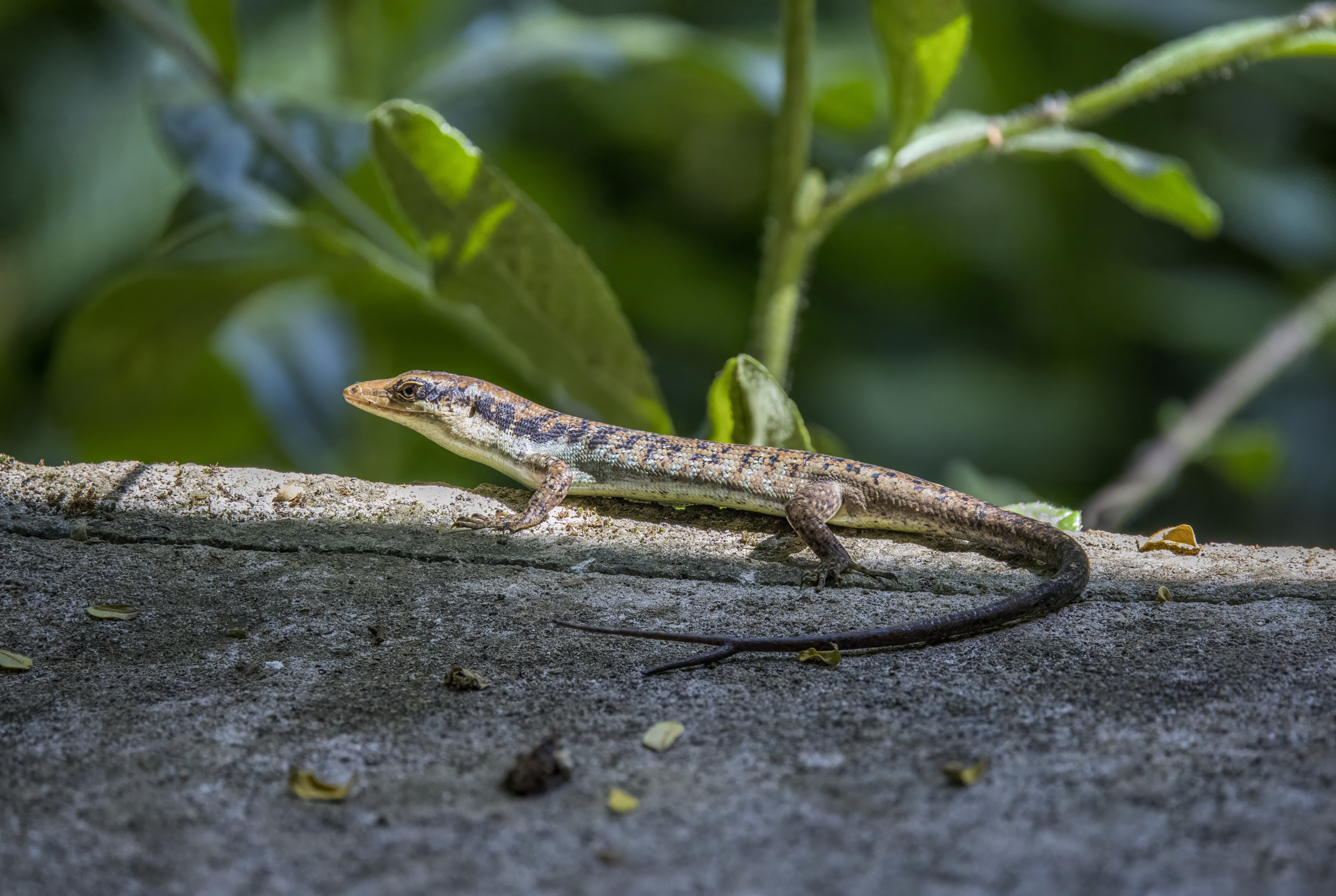
- Rarotonga treeskink Emoia tuitarere, Cook Islands

Scientific classification
- Kingdom: Animalia
- Phylum: Chordata
- Class: Reptilia
- Order: Squamata
- Family: Scincidae
- Subfamily: Eugongylinae
- Genus: Emoia; Gray, 1845

Type species
- Scincus atrocostatus Lesson, 1830

Species
- 78, see text

Synonyms
- Emoa Girard, 1857

= Emoia =

Genus of lizards

Emoia is a genus of lizards in the subfamily Eugongylinae of the family Scincidae (skinks). The genus Emoia belongs to a group of genera mainly from the southwestern Pacific-Australian region. These small skinks are commonly known as emoias, emo skinks, and skinks.

== Species ==
List of 78 valid Emoia species and their respective authors, geographical ranges, and common names from the Reptile Database:

Species	Region	Geographical range	Common name
Emoia adspersa (Steindachner, 1870)	Oceania	South Pacific	Steindachner's emo skink, Micronesian skink, dark-sided emoia, dark-sided skink, dateline emoia
Emoia aenea W.C. Brown & F. Parker, 1985	New Guinea	S. New Guinea	bronze emo skink
Emoia aneityumensis Medway, 1974	Vanuatu	Aneityum	Medway's emo skink, Anatom emo skink
Emoia arnoensis W.C. Brown & Marshall, 1953	Micronesia	Carolines, Marshalls, Nauru, Micronesia	Micronesia black skink
Emoia atrocostata (Lesson, 1830)	widespread	Asia	littoral whiptail-skink, mangrove skink, littoral skink
Emoia aurulenta W.C. Brown & F. Parker, 1985	New Guinea	SW PNG	Brown's emo skink, golden forest skink
Emoia battersbyi (Procter, 1923)	New Guinea	N. New Guinea	Battersby's emo skink
Emoia baudini (A.M.C. Duméril & Bibron, 1839)	New Guinea, Maluku	Bird's Head and nearby islands	great bight cool-skink, Baudin's skink
Emoia beryllion Kraus, 2018	Rossel Island	Rossel Island	
Emoia bismarckensis W.C. Brown, 1983	New Britain	New Britain (Bismarck Archipelago)	
Emoia boettgeri (Sternfeld, 1918)	Micronesia	Carolines (e.g. Ponape), Marshall Islands, Micronesia (Lukunor Atoll), Uman District Islands	Boettger's emo skink, Micronesia forest skink
Emoia bogerti W.C. Brown, 1953	New Guinea	Baliem, Papua, Indonesia highlands	Bogert's emo skink
Emoia brongersmai W.C. Brown, 1991	New Guinea	Sibil Valley, upper Digul drainage, Irian Jaya	Brongersma's emo skink, Brongersma's forest skink
Emoia caeruleocauda (De Vis, 1892)	Pacific	Pacific	Pacific bluetail skink
Emoia callisticta (W. Peters & Doria, 1878)	New Guinea	Sorong	
Emoia campbelli W.C. Brown & J.R.H. Gibbons, 1986	Fiji	Viti Levu	montane emo skink, Vitilevu Mountain treeskink
Emoia coggeri W.C. Brown, 1991	New Guinea	Singorakai, northern Huon Peninsula, Morobe Province, Papua New Guinea	Cogger's emo skink
Emoia concolor (A.H.A. Duméril, 1851)	Fiji	Fiji Islands, Rotuma Island	Fiji green emo skink, Viti slender treeskink
Emoia cyanogaster (Lesson, 1830)	Melanesia	PNG, Solomons, Vanuatu, Admiralty	Teal emo skink
Emoia cyanura (Lesson, 1830)	Pacific	Pacific	copper-tailed skink
Emoia cyclops W.C. Brown, 1991	New Guinea	Cyclops Mountains	Cyclops emo skink
Emoia digul W.C. Brown, 1991	New Guinea	Sibil Valley, upper Digul drainage, Irian Jaya	Digul emo skink
Emoia erronan W.C. Brown, 1991	Vanuatu	Futuna Island	common emo skink, Erronan treeskink
Emoia flavigularis Schmidt, 1932	Solomons	(Bougainville), Solomons	yellow-throated emo skink
Emoia guttata W.C. Brown & Allison, 1986	New Guinea	Morobe Province	Allison's emo skink
Emoia impar (F. Werner, 1898)	Oceania	South Pacific	dark-bellied copper-striped skink, azure-tailed skink
Emoia irianensis W.C. Brown, 1991	New Guinea	Paniai Lakes	Irian emo skink
Emoia isolata W.C. Brown, 1991	Solomons	Solomon Islands (Rennell Island); Bellona Island	isolated emo skink
Emoia jakati (Kopstein, 1926)	Oceania	South Pacific	Kopstein's emo skink
Emoia jamur W.C. Brown, 1991	New Guinea	Gariau area, Jamur Lake, on neck of land south of Geelvink Bay, Irian Jaya	Jamur emo skink
Emoia kitcheneri How, Durrant, L.A. Smith & Saleh, 1998	Sumba	Sumba	
Emoia klossi (Boulenger, 1914)	New Guinea, Maluku	East Indonesia; PNG	Kloss's emo skink
Emoia kordoana (A. Meyer, 1874)	New Guinea, Maluku	East Indonesia; PNG	Meyer's emo skink
Emoia kuekenthali (Boettger, 1895)	New Guinea, Maluku	Maluku, Admiralties	Kuekenthal's emo skink
Emoia laobaoensis Bourret, 1937	Asia	Quang Tri	Bourret's emo skink, Laobao mangrove skink
Emoia lawesii (Günther, 1874)	Oceania	Niue, Samoa, Tonga	Günther's emo skink, olive small-scaled skink
Emoia longicauda (Macleay, 1877)	widespread	East Indonesia; PNG; Queensland	shrub whiptail-skink
Emoia loveridgei W.C. Brown, 1953	New Guinea	Toem, Irian Jaya	Loveridge's emo skink
Emoia loyaltiensis (Roux, 1913)	Loyalty Islands	Mare and Lifou islands, Loyalty Islands	Roux's emo skink, Loyalty Islands emoia
Emoia maculata W.C. Brown, 1954	Solomons	Ugi Island; Solomons	spotted emo skink, spotted blue-tailed skink
Emoia maxima W.C. Brown, 1953	New Guinea	New Guinea	great emo skink
Emoia mivarti (Boulenger, 1887)	New Guinea, Maluku	Admiralty Islands, Waigeo and N Irian Jaya (Indonesia), Bismarck Archipelago	Boulenger's emo skink, Admiralty five-striped skink
Emoia mokolahi Zug, Ineich, Pregill & Hamilton, 2012	Tonga	Tonga Islands (Vava‘u)	
Emoia mokosariniveikau Zug & Ineich, 1995	Fiji	Vanua Levu	Vanualevu slender treeskink
Emoia montana W.C. Brown, 1991	New Guinea	Papua New Guinea (Baiyer River drainage, Western Highlands Province)	mountain emo skink
Emoia nativitatis (Boulenger, 1887)	Christmas Islands	Christmas Islands	Christmas Island forest skink, Christmas Island whiptail skink
Emoia nigra (Jacquinot & Guichenot, 1853)	Melanesia	Bismarcks; Solomons; Vanuatu	black emo skink
Emoia nigromarginata (Roux, 1913)	Vanuatu	Vanuatu	black-bordered emo skink, Vanuatu silver vineskink
Emoia obscura (De Jong, 1927)	New Guinea	New Guinea	obscure emo skink
Emoia oribata W.C. Brown, 1953	New Guinea	New Guinea	
Emoia oriva Zug, 2012	Fiji	Fiji Islands (Rotuma)	
Emoia pallidiceps (De Vis, 1890)	New Guinea	New Guinea; Bismarcks	De Vis's emo skink
Emoia paniai W.C. Brown, 1991	New Guinea	Paniai, Wissel Lakes, Irian Jaya	coastal emo skink
Emoia parkeri W.C. Brown, Pernetta & D. Watling, 1980	Fiji	Fiji Islands (Kadavu, Viti Levu, Ovalau, Taveuni)	Parker's emo skink, Viti copper-headed skink
Emoia physicae (A.M.C. Duméril & Bibron, 1839)	New Guinea	Papua New Guinea; Morobe and Gulf	slender emo skink
Emoia physicina W.C. Brown & F. Parker, 1985	New Guinea	S. New Guinea	five-toed emo skink, small keel-scaled skink
Emoia ponapea Kiester, 1982	Micronesia	Caroline Islands, Ponape (Pacific), Micronesia	Kiester's emo skink, Ponape skink
Emoia popei W.C. Brown, 1953	New Guinea	Marienberg; PNG	Pope's emo skink
Emoia pseudocyanura W.C. Brown, 1991	Solomons	(Bougainville), Solomon Islands	false bluetail emo skink
Emoia pseudopallidiceps W.C. Brown, 1991	New Guinea	S. New Guinea	arboreal emo skink
Emoia reimschisseli V. Tanner, 1950	Maluku	Moratai Island, Moluccas	Reimschisel's emo skink
Emoia rennellensis W.C. Brown, 1991	Solomons	Solomons (Rennell Island)	bright emo skink, Rennell blue-tailed skink
Emoia ruficauda Taylor, 1915	ISEA	Philippines (Mindanao), Indonesia (Sulawesi ?)	redtail emo skink
Emoia rufilabialis M. McCoy & Webber, 1984	Solomons	(Santa Cruz Islands)	red-lipped emo skink
Emoia samoensis (A.H.A. Duméril in A.M.C. Duméril & A.H.A. Duméril, 1851) – Samoan skink	Oceania	Western and American Samoa, Cook Island	Samoa skink
Emoia sanfordi Schmidt & Burt, 1930	Vanuatu	Vanuatu	Sanford's emo skink, Sanford's tree skink
Emoia schmidti W.C. Brown, 1954	Solomons	Solomon Islands (New Georgia Island)	Schmidt's emo skink
Emoia similis Dunn, 1927	Indonesia	Lesser Sundas	Dunn's emo skink
Emoia slevini W.C. Brown & Falanruw, 1972	Micronesia	Mariana Islands	Slevin's emo skink, Mariana skink
Emoia sorex (Boettger, 1895)	Maluku	Maluku	Sorex emo skink
Emoia submetallica (Macleay, 1877)	New Guinea	PNG	Madeay's emo skink
Emoia taumakoensis M. McCoy & Webber, 1984	Solomons	Santz Cruz; Taumako, Duff Islands, Solomon Islands.	Taurnako emo skink
Emoia tetrataenia (Boulenger, 1895)	New Guinea	New Guinea	four-striped emo skink
Emoia tongana (F. Werner, 1899)	Tonga, Samoa	Western Samoa and some northern Tongan islands (Futuna, Niuafo’ou, Niuatoputapu, Va’vau, Ha’apai)	Polynesia slender treeskink
Emoia tropidolepis (Boulenger, 1914)	New Guinea	S. New Guinea	forest emo skink
Emoia trossula W.C. Brown & J.R.H. Gibbons, 1986	Oceania	Fiji Islands, Rotuma Island, Cook Islands, Tonga	Fiji barred treeskink, Gibbons's emo skink, Viti barred treeskink
Emoia tuitarere Zug, Hamilton & C. Austin, 2011	Oceania	Rarotonga	Rarotonga treeskink
Emoia veracunda W.C. Brown, 1953	New Guinea	Sepik River, Marienberg	tropical emo skink

Nota bene: A binomial authority in parentheses indicates that the species was originally described in a genus other than Emoia.
