= List of species on Caroline Island =

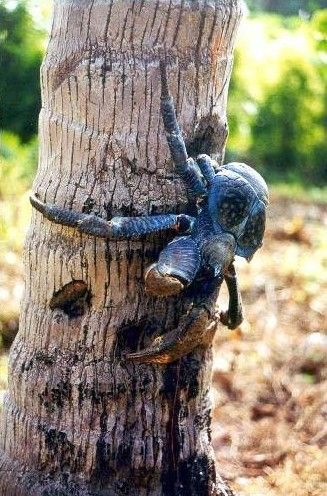
Although it remains unclear whether or not the coconut crab is endangered, Caroline Island hosts a substantial population of the arthropod.

Species recorded on Caroline Island, one of the Line Islands in the south-central Pacific Ocean:

== Flora ==
=== Trees ===
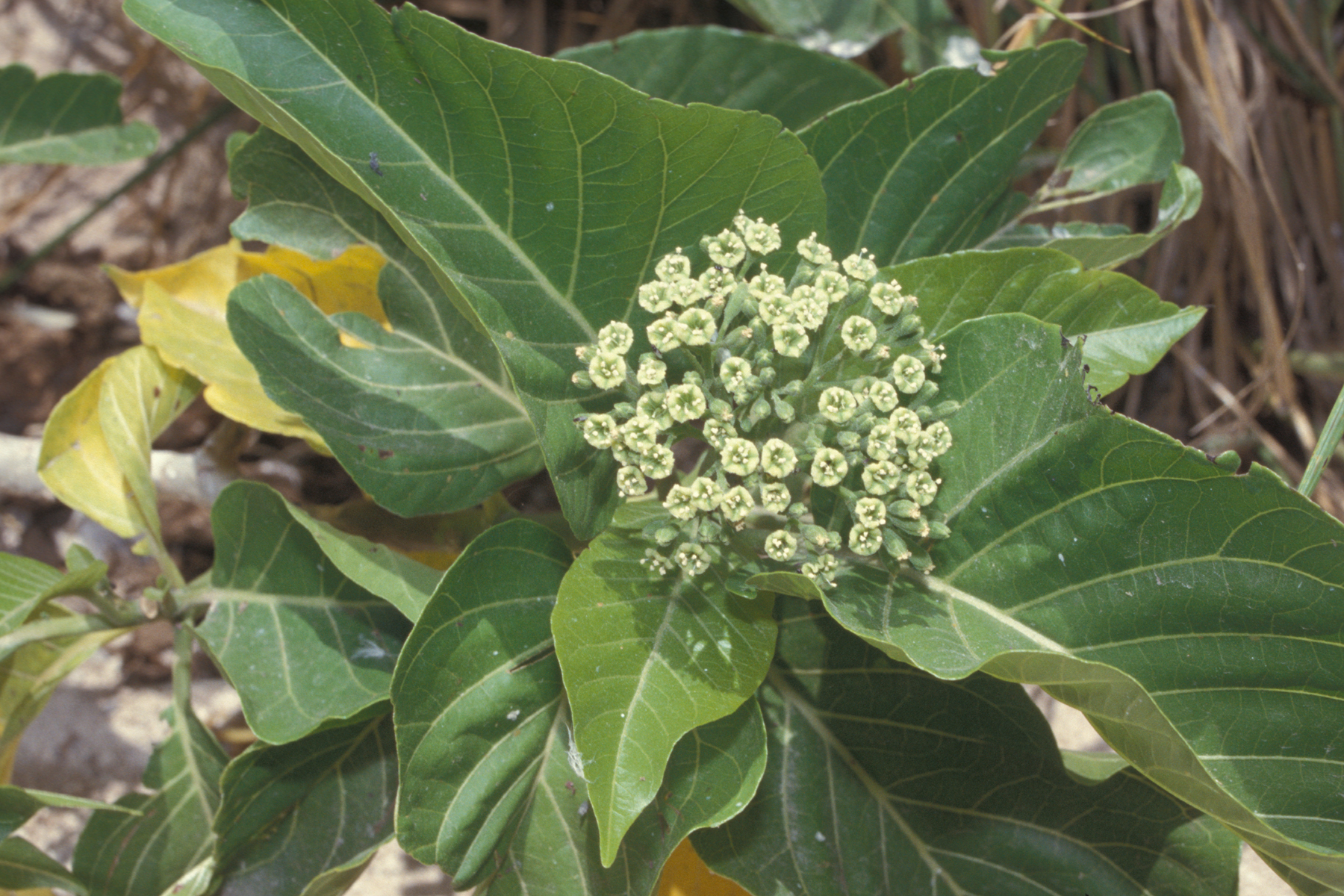
Groves of Pisonia grandis cover the central portions of many islets.

- Calophyllum
- Cocos nucifera
- Cordia subcordata
- Hibiscus tiliaceus
- Morinda citrifolia

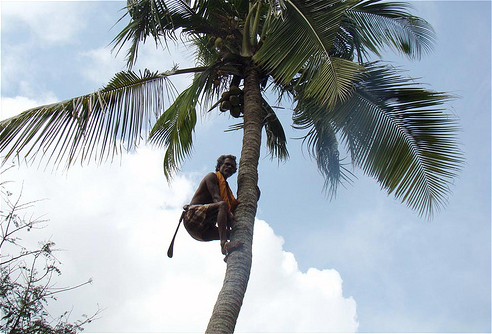
Although not native, coconut palms were planted on many of Caroline's islets in the 1920s and earlier, but are now largely gone.

- Pandanus tectorius
- Pisonia grandis
- Thespesia populnea

=== Shrubs ===
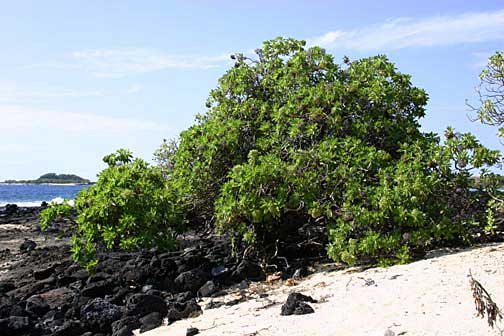
Large stretches of Heliotropium foertherianum shrub cover many of Caroline's islets.

- Heliotropium foertherianum
- Scaevola taccada
- Suriana maritima
- Ximenia americana

=== Herbs ===
- Achyranthes canscens
- Boerhavia repens
- Heliotropium anomalum
- Ipomoea macrantha
- Ipomoea violacea
- Laportea ruderalis
- Lepidium bidentatum
- Lepturus repens
- Lygodium microphyllum
- Phyllanthus amarus
- Phymatosorus scolopendria
- Portulaca lutea
- Psilotum nudum
- Sida fallax
- Tacca leontopetaloides
- Tribulus cistoides

== Fauna ==
=== Nesting seabirds ===
- Black noddy (Anous minutus)
- Blue-grey noddy (Procelsterna cerulea) (Kepler)
- Brown booby (Sula leucogaster)
- Brown noddy (Anous stolidus)
- Great frigatebird (Fregata minor)
- Lesser frigatebird (Fregata ariel)
- Masked booby (Sula dactylatra)
- Red-footed booby (Sula sula)
- Red-tailed tropicbird (Phaethon rubricauda) (Kepler)

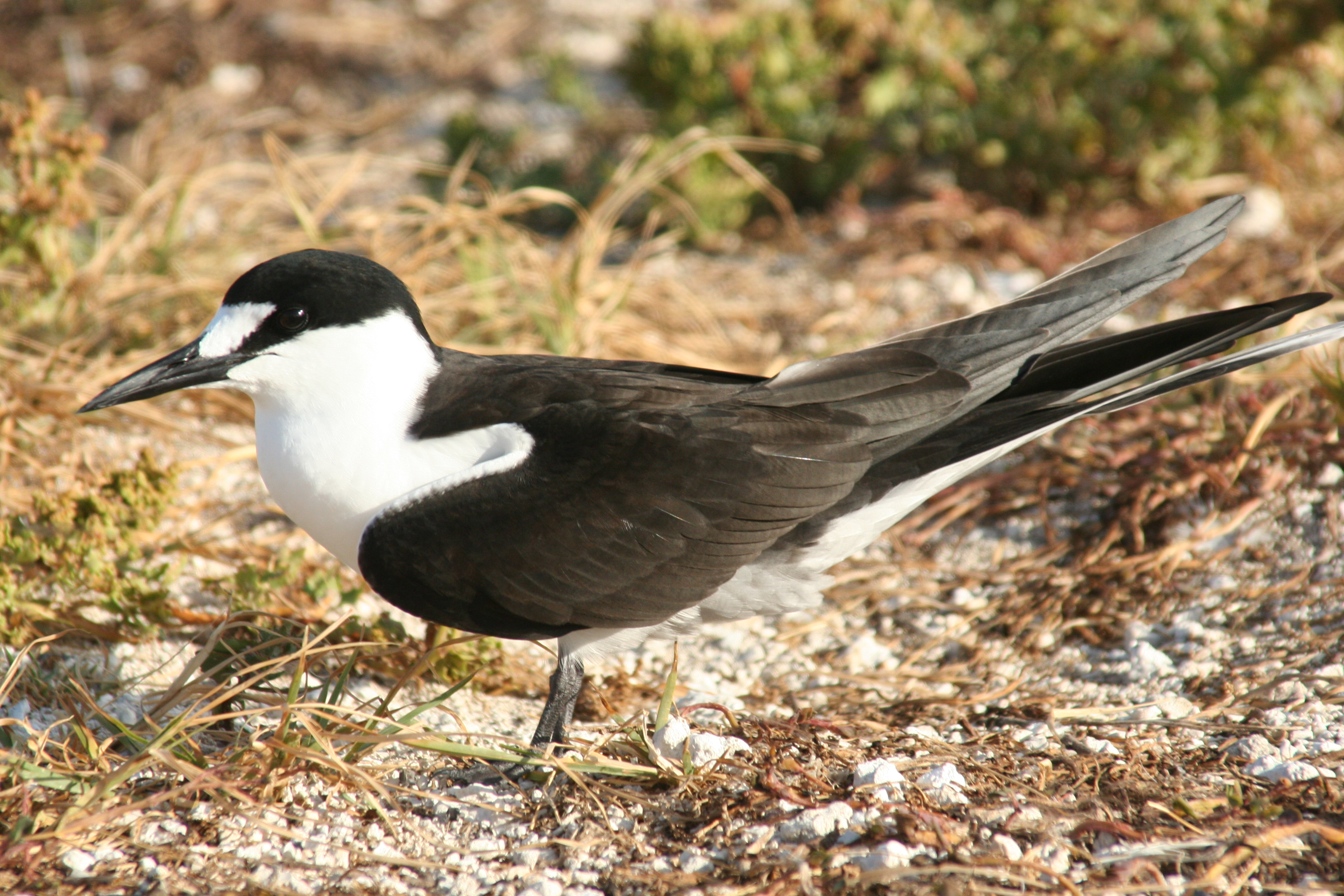
Caroline Island is a major nesting site for the sooty tern.

- Sooty tern (Onychoprion fuscata)
- White tern (Gygis alba)

=== Other birds ===
- Bristle-thighed curlew (Numenius tahitiensis)

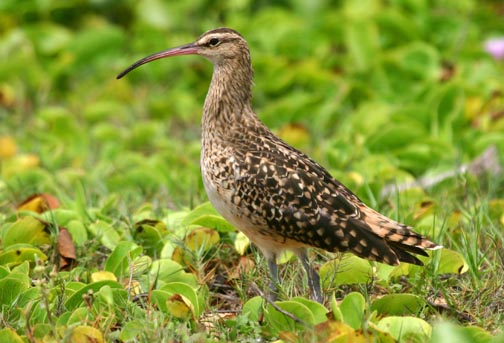
The bristle-thighed curlew is among the vulnerable species which occasionally visit Caroline Atoll.

- Lesser golden-plover (Pluvialis dominica) (Kepler)
- Long-tailed cuckoo (Eudynamis taitensis)
- Pacific golden plover (Pluvialis fulva)
- Reef heron (Egretta sacra) (Kepler)
- Ruddy turnstone (Arenaria interpres) (Kepler)
- Sanderling (Crocethia alba) (Kepler)
- Short-eared owl (Asio flammeus ponapensis)
- Wandering tattler (Tringa incana)

=== Lizards ===
- Azure-tailed skink (Emoia cyanura) (Kepler)
- Emoia impar (Kepler)
- Moth skink (Lipinia noctua) (Kepler)
- Mourning gecko (Lepidodactylus lugubris) (Kepler)
- Polynesian gecko (Gehyra oceanica) (Kepler)

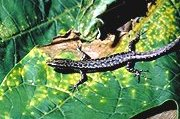
Six species of lizards, including Cryptoblepharus poecilopleurus, have been noted on Caroline Island.

- Snake-eyed skink (Cryptoblepharus poecilopleurus) (Kepler)

=== Mammals ===
- Pacific bottlenose dolphin (Tursiops gilli) (Kepler)
- Polynesian rat (Rattus exulans) (Kepler)

=== Turtles ===
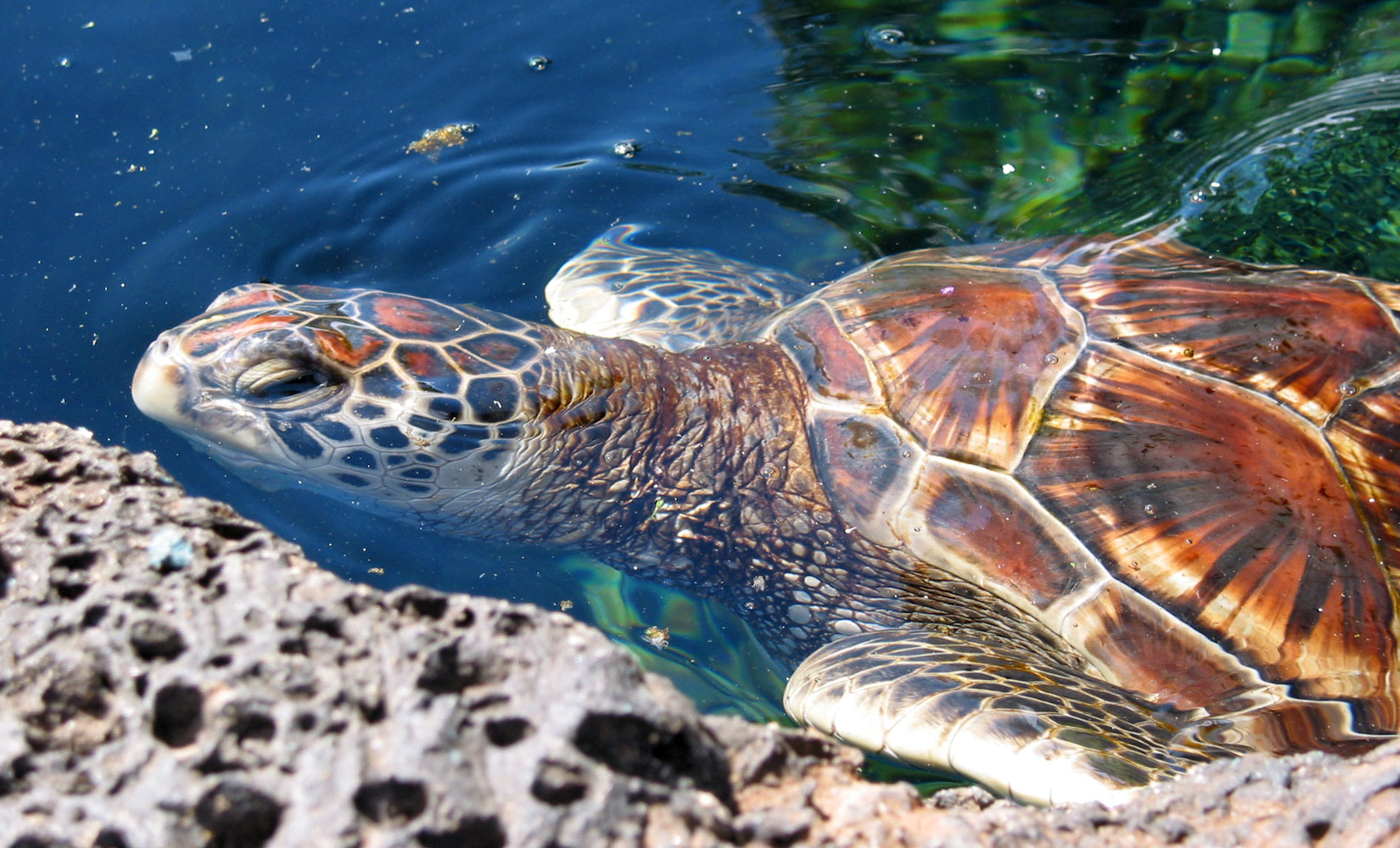
The green sea turtle is believed to nest on the beaches of Caroline Island.

- Green sea turtle (Chelonia mydas)

=== Crabs ===
- Coconut crab (Birgus largo)
- Red spotted crab (Carpilius maculatus) (Kepler)
- Scarlet crab (Cornobita perlatus) (Kepler)

=== Polychaetes ===
- Calcareous tubeworm (Serpula tetratropia)
