= Emoia parkeri =

Conservation status
- Vulnerable (IUCN 3.1)

Scientific classification
- Kingdom: Animalia
- Phylum: Chordata
- Class: Reptilia
- Order: Squamata
- Family: Scincidae
- Genus: Emoia
- Species: E. parkeri

Binomial name
- Emoia parkeri W.C. Brown, Pernetta, & Watling, 1980

Species of lizard

Emoia parkeri, also known commonly as Parker's emo skink and the Viti copper-headed skink, is a species of lizard in the subfamily Eugongylinae of the family Scincidae. The species is endemic to Fiji.

== Etymology ==
The specific name, parkeri, is in honor of English zoologist Hampton Wildman Parker.

== Geographic distribution ==
In Fiji, Emoia parkeri has been found on the following islands: Kadavu, Ovalau, Taveuni, and Viti Levu.

== Habitat ==
The preferred natural habitat of Emoia parkeri is forest, at elevations from sea level to 500 m (1,600 ft).

== Reproduction ==
Emoia parkeri is oviparous.
