= Emoia mokosariniveikau =

Conservation status
- Endangered (IUCN 3.1)

Scientific classification
- Kingdom: Animalia
- Phylum: Chordata
- Class: Reptilia
- Order: Squamata
- Family: Scincidae
- Genus: Emoia
- Species: E. mokosariniveikau

Binomial name
- Emoia mokosariniveikau Zug & Ineich, 1995

Species of lizard

Emoia mokosariniveikau, Vanualevu slender treeskink, is a species of lizard belonging to the subfamily Eugongylinae in the family Scincidae, the skinks. This skink is endemic to Fiji.

== Taxonomy ==
Emoia mokosariniveikau was first formally describedin 1995 by the American herpetologist George Robert Zug and French herpetologist Ivan Ineich with its type locality given as near Saivou, around 23 km (14 mi) bt road northwest of Savusavu on Vanua Levu in Fiji. This species is in the E. samoensis species complex within the genus Emoia. This genus is classified within the subfamily Eugongylinae in the family Scincidae.

== Etymology ==
Emoia mokosariniveikau is classified in the genus Emoia which was described by John Edward Gray in 1845, Gray did not explain this name. he may have derived it from the name of a person or place within the Pacific Islands, or he may have just made it up. The specific name prefixes a Fijian or Polynesian word for a small lizard, moko-. onto the Fijian ni veikau, which means "of the forest". This produces the phrae mokosari ni veikau or "small green lizard of the forest", and here is used as a noun in apposition.

== Description ==
Emoia mokosariniveikau has a coppery brown back, a plain bright coppery head; broad turquoise stripes on the side of the neck amd body, these reach up as high as the midline and are continuous on the neck and front of the body, becomining more irregular twoards the tail. The lower body has small, irregular bars of dark brown or black, typically with blue margins. The tail has dark bars alternate interspaced with brown then beige. The ventral surface from the throat to the base of the tail is pale orangish yellow, bordered on the chin and sides by pale turquoise from the lateral bands. Legs are coppery beige above with dark spots and plain uniform yellow below. There is a distinct dark stripе on the rear of the thigh. The holotype had a snout-to-vent length of 55 mm (2.2 in).

== Distribution and habitat ==
Emoia mokosariniveikau is endemic to Fiji weher it has been recoreded from two locations on Vanua Levu and from Druadrua and Gevo Islands. It is an arboreal species which has only been found on forest trees, it may be restricted to primary forest.

== Conservation staus ==
Emoia mokosariniveikau has been assessed as Endangered by the International Union for Conservation of Nature because it has a highly restricted distribution and its habitat continues to decline in area and quality due to fires and forest clearnance.
