= Emoia campbelli =

Conservation status
- Endangered (IUCN 3.1)

Scientific classification
- Kingdom: Animalia
- Phylum: Chordata
- Class: Reptilia
- Order: Squamata
- Family: Scincidae
- Genus: Emoia
- Species: E. campbelli

Binomial name
- Emoia campbelli W.C. Brown & Gibbons, 1986

Species of lizard

Emoia campbelli, also known commonly as Campbell's skink, the montane emo skink, and the Vitilevu mountain treeskink, is a species of lizard in the family Scincidae. The species is endemic to the island of Viti Levu in Fiji.

== Etymology ==
The specific name, campbelli, is in honor of geologist John Campbell who collected the holotype.

== Habitat ==
The preferred natural habitat of E. campbelli is forest, at altitudes of 700–1,000 m (2,300–3,300 ft).

== Behavior ==
E. campbelli is arboreal, living in the forest canopy, and sheltering in epiphytic myrmecophytes (ant plants).

== Reproduction ==
E. campbelli is oviparous. Clutch size is two eggs, which are laid in the chambers of ant plants.
