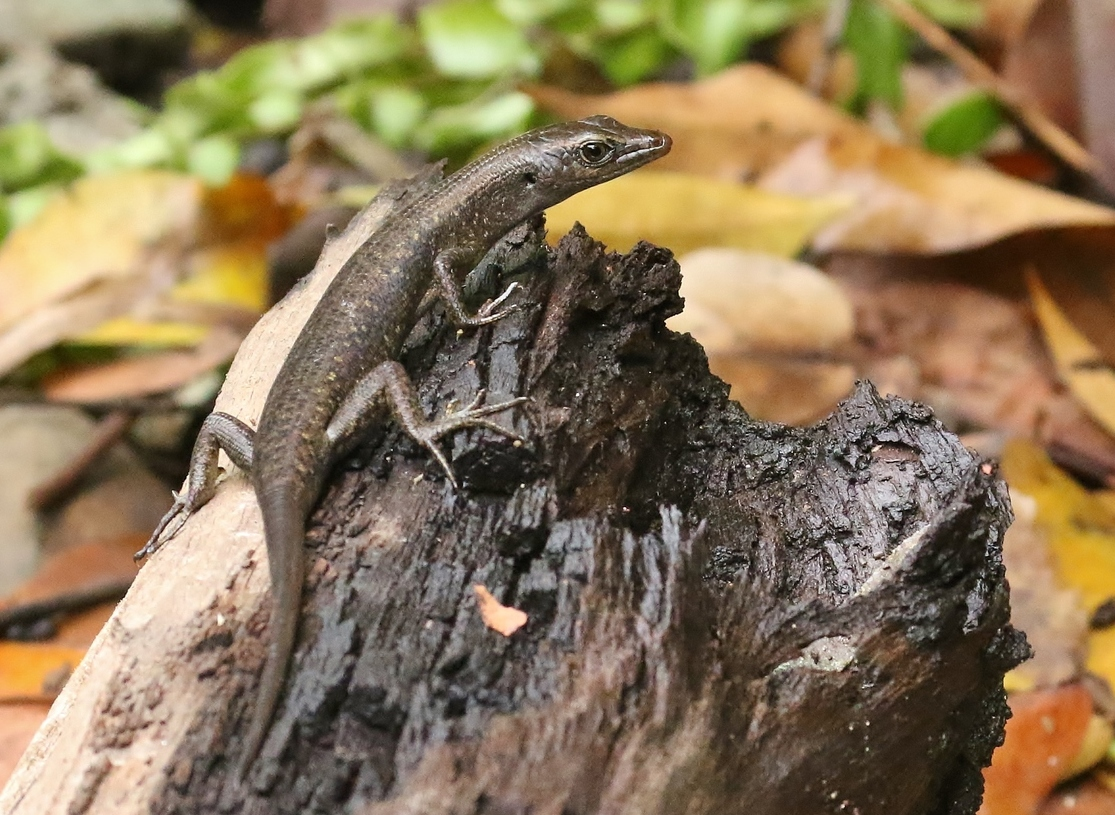

Conservation status
- Endangered (IUCN 3.1)

Scientific classification
- Kingdom: Animalia
- Phylum: Chordata
- Class: Reptilia
- Order: Squamata
- Family: Scincidae
- Genus: Emoia
- Species: E. boettgeri

Binomial name
- Emoia boettgeri (Sternfeld, 1918)
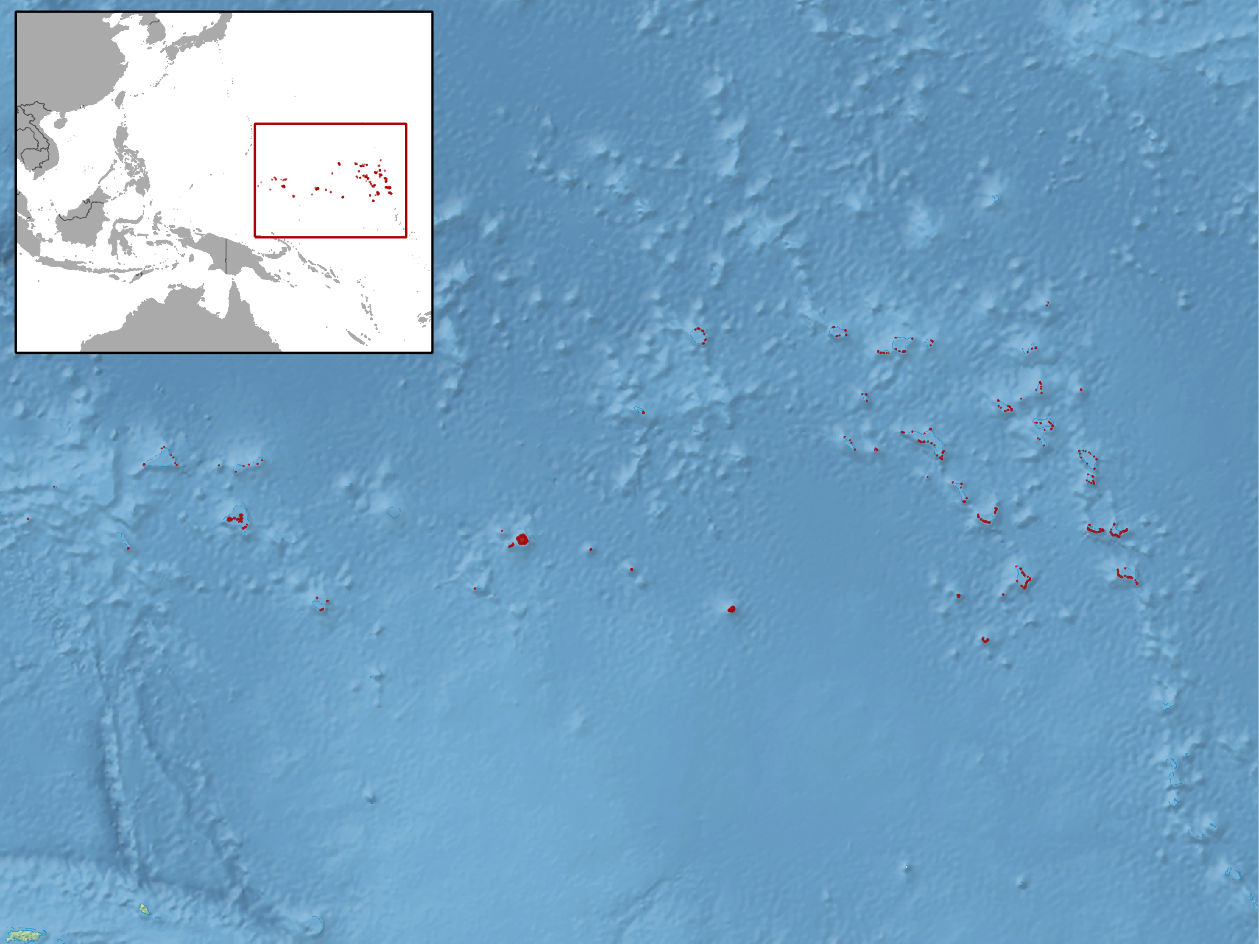

Synonyms
- Lygosoma (Emoa) boettgeri Sternfeld, 1918; Emoia boettgeri orientalis W.C. Brown & Marshall, 1953; Emoia boettgeri — Greer, 1974

= Emoia boettgeri =

Species of lizard

Emoia boettgeri, also known commonly as Boettger's emo skink, the Micronesia forest skink, and the Micronesia spotted skink, is a species of lizard in the family Scincidae. The species is native to Micronesia. There are no recognized subspecies.

== Etymology ==
The specific name, boettgeri, is in honor of German herpetologist Oskar Boettger.

== Geographic range ==
E. boettgeri is found in the Caroline Islands and the Marshall Islands in eastern Micronesia

== Habitat ==
The preferred natural habitat of E. boettgeri is forest, at altitudes from sea level to 780 m (2,560 ft).

== Behavior ==
E. boettgeri is terrestrial.

== Reproduction ==
E. boettgeri is oviparous.
