= Emoia ponapea =

Conservation status
- Endangered (IUCN 3.1)

Scientific classification
- Kingdom: Animalia
- Phylum: Chordata
- Class: Reptilia
- Order: Squamata
- Suborder: Scinciformata
- Infraorder: Scincomorpha
- Family: Eugongylidae
- Genus: Emoia
- Species: E. ponapea

Binomial name
- Emoia ponapea Kiester, 1982

Species of lizard

Kiester's emo skink or Ponape skink (Emoia ponapea) is a species of lizard in the family Scincidae occurring in Micronesia.
