= Emoia flavigularis =

Conservation status
- Least Concern (IUCN 3.1)

Scientific classification
- Kingdom: Animalia
- Phylum: Chordata
- Class: Reptilia
- Order: Squamata
- Suborder: Scinciformata
- Infraorder: Scincomorpha
- Family: Eugongylidae
- Genus: Emoia
- Species: E. flavigularis

Binomial name
- Emoia flavigularis Schmidt, 1932

Species of lizard

Emoia flavigularis, the yellow-throated emo skink, is a species of lizard in the family Scincidae. It is found in Bougainville and the Solomon Islands.
