= Emoia digul =

Conservation status
- Data Deficient (IUCN 3.1)

Scientific classification
- Kingdom: Animalia
- Phylum: Chordata
- Class: Reptilia
- Order: Squamata
- Family: Scincidae
- Genus: Emoia
- Species: E. digul

Binomial name
- Emoia digul Brown, 1991

Species of lizard

Emoia digul, the Digul emo skink, is a species of lizard in the family Scincidae. It is found in Indonesia.
