= Emoia coggeri =

Cogger's emo skink

Conservation status
- Data Deficient (IUCN 3.1)

Scientific classification
- Kingdom: Animalia
- Phylum: Chordata
- Class: Reptilia
- Order: Squamata
- Family: Scincidae
- Genus: Emoia
- Species: E. coggeri

Binomial name
- Emoia coggeri W.C. Brown, 1991

Species of lizard

Emoia coggeri, Cogger's emo skink, is a species of lizard in the family Scincidae. The species is endemic to Papua New Guinea.

== Etymology ==
The specific name, coggeri, is in honor of Australian herpetologist Harold George "Hal" Cogger.

== Habitat ==
The preferred natural habitat of E. coggeri is unknown.

== Reproduction ==
E. coggeri is oviparous. Clutch size is two eggs.
