= Emoia concolor =

Conservation status
- Near Threatened (IUCN 3.1)

Scientific classification
- Kingdom: Animalia
- Phylum: Chordata
- Class: Reptilia
- Order: Squamata
- Suborder: Scinciformata
- Infraorder: Scincomorpha
- Family: Eugongylidae
- Genus: Emoia
- Species: E. concolor

Binomial name
- Emoia concolor (Duméril, 1851)

Species of lizard

Emoia concolor, the Fiji green emo skink or Viti slender treeskink, is a species of lizard in the family Scincidae. It is found on Rotuma in Fiji.
