= Emoia paniai =

Conservation status
- Data Deficient (IUCN 3.1)

Scientific classification
- Kingdom: Animalia
- Phylum: Chordata
- Class: Reptilia
- Order: Squamata
- Family: Scincidae
- Genus: Emoia
- Species: E. paniai

Binomial name
- Emoia paniai W.C. Brown, 1991

Species of lizard

Emoia paniai, also known commonly as the coastal emo skink, is a species of lizard in the subfamily Eugongylinae of the family Scincidae. The species is endemic to Western New Guinea.

== Etymology ==
The specific name, paniai, refers to the Lake Paniai area in Western New Guinea.

== Geographic distribution ==
Emoia paniai is known only from its type locality: "Paniai, Wissel Lakes, Irian Jaya".

== Habitat ==
The natural habitats at the type locality of Emoia paniai are forest, and grassland, at elevations of approximately 2,000 m (6,600 ft).

== Reproduction ==
Emoia paniai is oviparous.
