= Emoia oriva =

Scientific classification
- Domain: Eukaryota
- Kingdom: Animalia
- Phylum: Chordata
- Class: Reptilia
- Order: Squamata
- Family: Scincidae
- Genus: Emoia
- Species: E. oriva

Binomial name
- Emoia oriva Zug, 2012

Species of lizard

Emoia oriva is a species of lizard in the family Scincidae. It is found in Fiji.
