= Emoia aurulenta =

Conservation status
- Least Concern (IUCN 3.1)

Scientific classification
- Kingdom: Animalia
- Phylum: Chordata
- Class: Reptilia
- Order: Squamata
- Suborder: Scinciformata
- Infraorder: Scincomorpha
- Family: Eugongylidae
- Genus: Emoia
- Species: E. aurulenta

Binomial name
- Emoia aurulenta Brown & Parker, 1985

Species of lizard

Emoia aurulenta, Brown's emo skink or the golden forest skink, is a species of lizard in the family Scincidae. It is found in Papua New Guinea.
