= Emoia loveridgei =

Conservation status
- Least Concern (IUCN 3.1)

Scientific classification
- Kingdom: Animalia
- Phylum: Chordata
- Class: Reptilia
- Order: Squamata
- Family: Scincidae
- Genus: Emoia
- Species: E. loveridgei

Binomial name
- Emoia loveridgei W.C. Brown, 1953
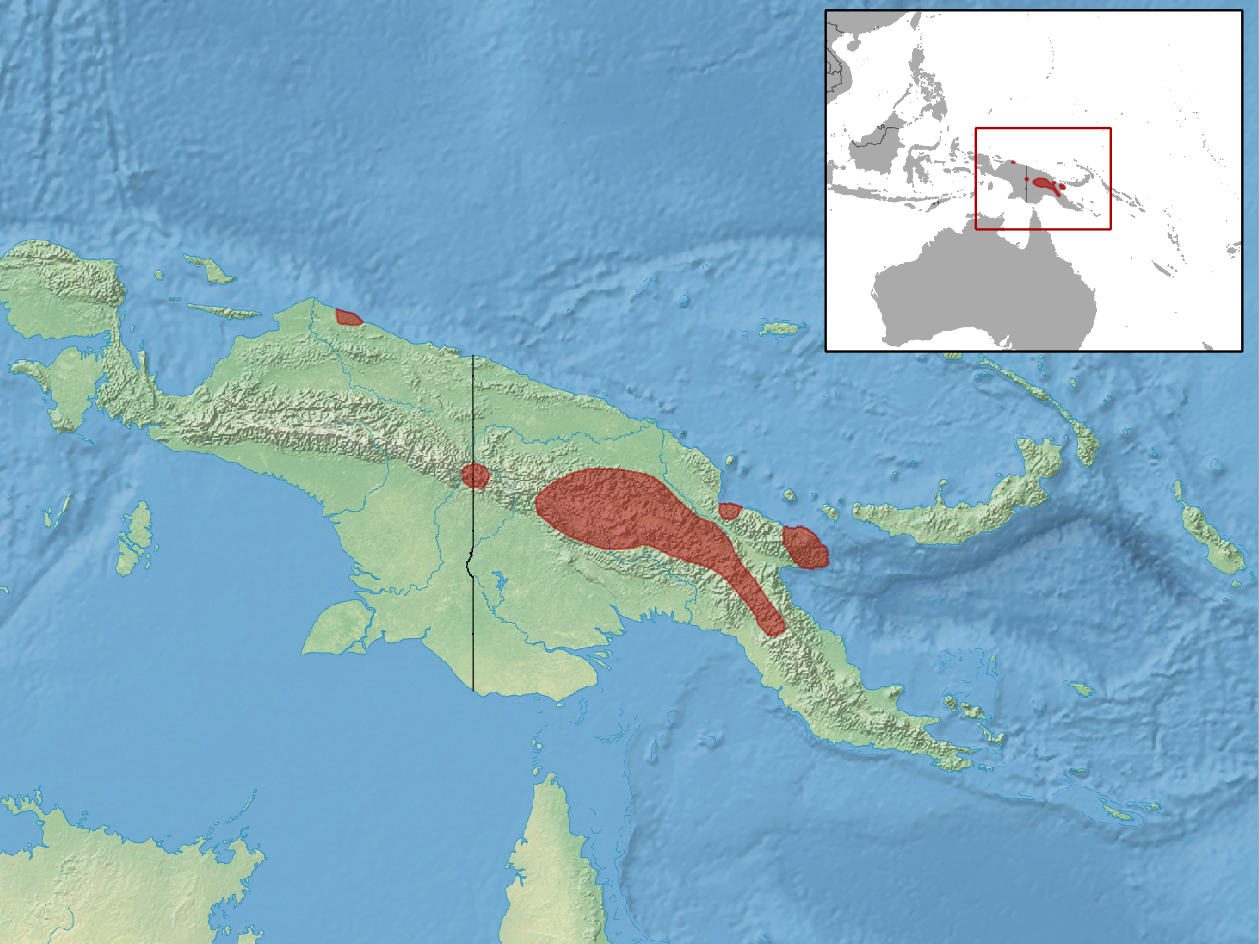

Species of lizard

Emoia loveridgei, also known commonly as Loveridge's emo skink and Loveridges's skink, is a species of lizard in the subfamily Eugongylinae of the family Scincidae. The species is native to Indonesia and Papua New Guinea.

== Etymology ==
The specific name, loveridgei, is in honor of herpetologist Arthur Loveridge.

== Habitat ==
The preferred natural habitat of Emoia loveridgei is forest, at altitudes from sea level to 2,000 m (6,600 ft).

== Behavior ==
Emoia loveridgei is terrestrial.

== Reproduction ==
Emoia loveridgei is oviparous.
