= Emoia popei =

Conservation status
- Least Concern (IUCN 3.1)

Scientific classification
- Kingdom: Animalia
- Phylum: Chordata
- Class: Reptilia
- Order: Squamata
- Family: Scincidae
- Genus: Emoia
- Species: E. popei

Binomial name
- Emoia popei Brown, 1953

Species of lizard

Pope's emo skink (Emoia popei) is a species of lizard in the family Scincidae. It is found in Papua New Guinea.
