= Emoia pseudocyanura =

Conservation status
- Least Concern (IUCN 3.1)

Scientific classification
- Kingdom: Animalia
- Phylum: Chordata
- Class: Reptilia
- Order: Squamata
- Suborder: Scinciformata
- Infraorder: Scincomorpha
- Family: Eugongylidae
- Genus: Emoia
- Species: E. pseudocyanura

Binomial name
- Emoia pseudocyanura Brown, 1991

Species of lizard

The false bluetail emo skink (Emoia pseudocyanura) is a species of lizard in the family Scincidae. It is found in Bougainville and the Solomon Islands.
