= Emoia trossula =

Conservation status
- Endangered (IUCN 3.1)

Scientific classification
- Kingdom: Animalia
- Phylum: Chordata
- Class: Reptilia
- Order: Squamata
- Family: Scincidae
- Genus: Emoia
- Species: E. trossula

Binomial name
- Emoia trossula W.C. Brown & J.R.H. Gibbons, 1986

Species of lizard

Emoia trossula, also known commonly as the Fiji barred treeskink, Gibbons's emo skink, and the Viti barred treeskink, is a species of lizard in the family Scincidae. The species is native to archipelagos in the tropical Pacific Ocean.

== Geographic range ==
E. trossula is found in the Fiji, Rotuma, Tonga, and Wallis and Futuna.

== Habitat ==
The preferred natural habitat of E. trossula is forest, at altitudes from sea level to 650 m (2,130 ft), but it has also been found in rural gardens and coconut plantations.

== Reproduction ==
E. trossula is oviparous.
