= Emoia longicauda =

Scientific classification
- Domain: Eukaryota
- Kingdom: Animalia
- Phylum: Chordata
- Class: Reptilia
- Order: Squamata
- Family: Scincidae
- Genus: Emoia
- Species: E. longicauda

Binomial name
- Emoia longicauda (Macleay, 1877)

Species of lizard

Emoia longicauda, the shrub whiptail-skink, is a species of skink. It is found in Indonesia, Papua New Guinea, and Queensland in Australia.
