= Emoia klossi =

Conservation status
- Data Deficient (IUCN 3.1)

Scientific classification
- Kingdom: Animalia
- Phylum: Chordata
- Class: Reptilia
- Order: Squamata
- Family: Scincidae
- Genus: Emoia
- Species: E. klossi

Binomial name
- Emoia klossi (Boulenger, 1914)

Synonyms
- Lygosoma klossi Boulenger, 1914

Species of lizard

Emoia klossi, also known commonly as Kloss's emo skink, Kloss' emo skink, and Kloss' skink, is a species of lizard in the subfamily Eugongylinae of the family Scincidae. The species is native to Indonesia and Papua New Guinea.

== Etymology ==
The specific name, klossi, is in honor of English zoologist Cecil Boden Kloss.

== Habitat ==
The preferred natural habitat of E. klossi is forest, at altitudes of 800–1,200 m (2,600–3,900 ft).

== Reproduction ==
E. klossi is oviparous.
