= Emoia kitcheneri =

Conservation status
- Data Deficient (IUCN 3.1)

Scientific classification
- Kingdom: Animalia
- Phylum: Chordata
- Class: Reptilia
- Order: Squamata
- Family: Scincidae
- Subfamily: Eugongylinae
- Genus: Emoia
- Species: E. kitcheneri

Binomial name
- Emoia kitcheneri How, Durrant, L.A. Smith & Saleh, 1998

Species of lizard

Emoia kitcheneri is a species of lizard in the subfamily Eugongylinae of the family Scincidae. The species is endemic to Sumba Island in Indonesia.

== Etymology ==
The specific name, kitcheneri, is in honor of Australian mammalogist Darrell J. Kitchener.

== Geographic range ==
E. kitcheneri has only been found in eastern Sumba.

== Habitat ==
The preferred natural habitat of E. kitcheneri is forest.

== Reproduction ==
E. kitcheneri is oviparous.

== Taxonomy ==
E. kitcheneri is a member of the "caerulocauda" subgroup of the "cyanura" species group.
