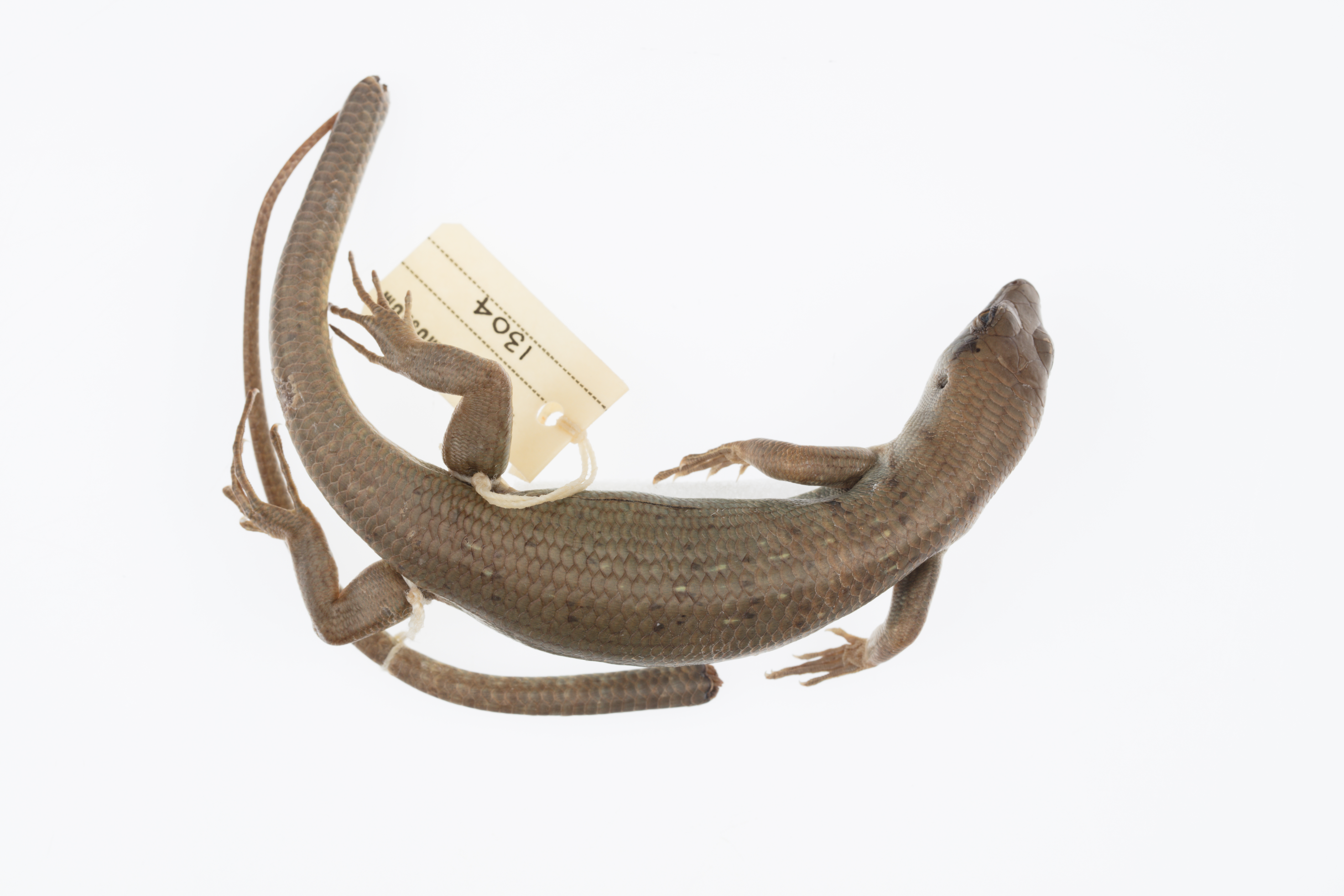

Scientific classification
- Kingdom: Animalia
- Phylum: Chordata
- Class: Reptilia
- Order: Squamata
- Family: Scincidae
- Genus: Emoia
- Species: E. mokolahi

Binomial name
- Emoia mokolahi Zug, Ineich, Pregill, & Hamilton, 2012

= Emoia mokolahi =

Species of lizard

Emoia mokolahi is a species of lizard in the family Scincidae. It is found in Tonga.
