= Emoia ruficauda =

Conservation status
- Least Concern (IUCN 3.1)

Scientific classification
- Kingdom: Animalia
- Phylum: Chordata
- Class: Reptilia
- Order: Squamata
- Family: Scincidae
- Genus: Emoia
- Species: E. ruficauda

Binomial name
- Emoia ruficauda Taylor, 1915
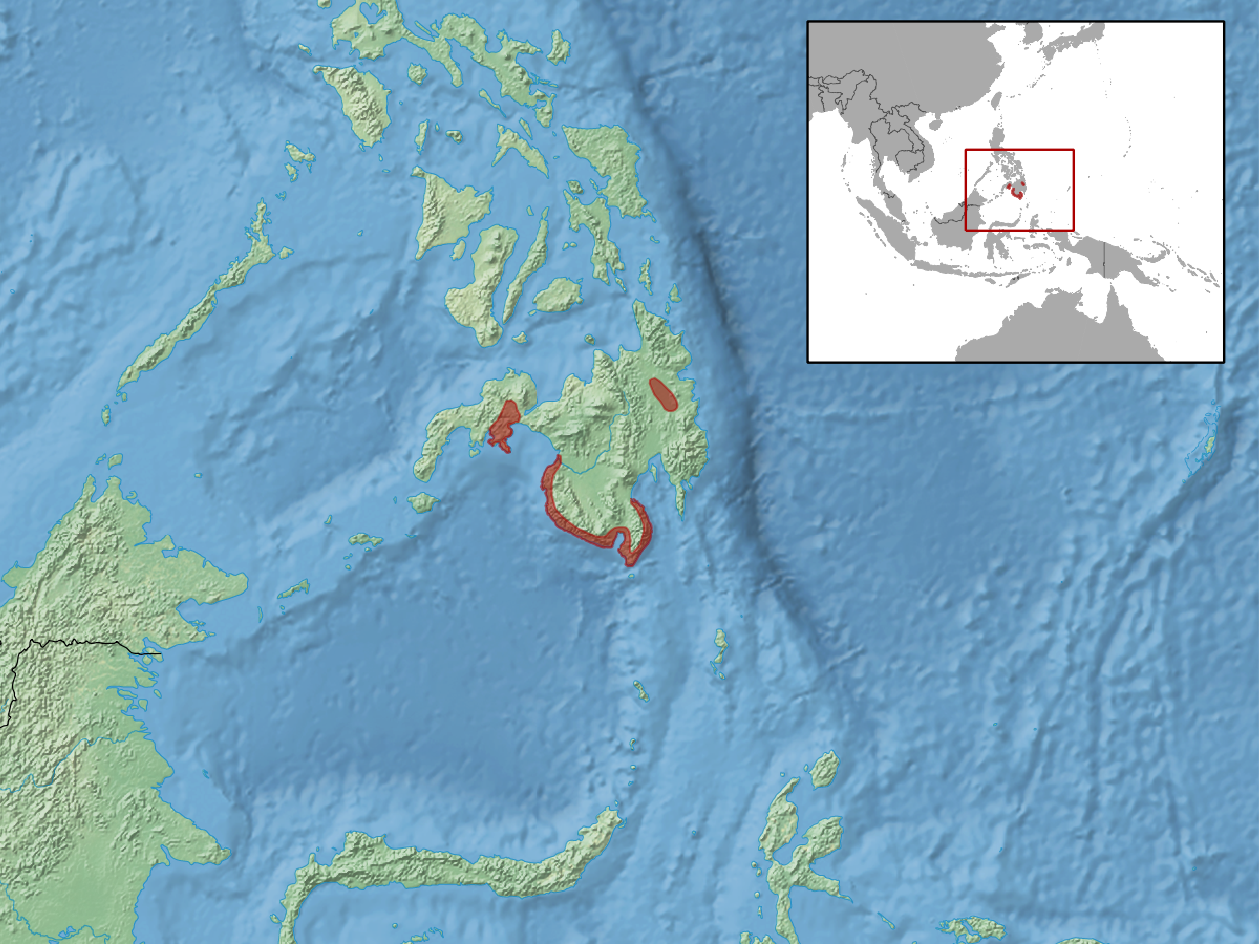

Species of lizard

The redtail emo skink (Emoia ruficauda) is a species of lizard in the family Scincidae. It is found in the Philippines and possibly Sulawesi.
