= Emoia physicina =

Conservation status
- Least Concern (IUCN 3.1)

Scientific classification
- Kingdom: Animalia
- Phylum: Chordata
- Class: Reptilia
- Order: Squamata
- Family: Scincidae
- Genus: Emoia
- Species: E. physicina

Binomial name
- Emoia physicina Brown & Parker, 1985

Species of lizard

The five-toed emo skink or small keel-scaled skink (Emoia physicina) is a species of lizard in the family Scincidae. It is found in Papua New Guinea and Indonesia.
