= Emoia erronan =

Conservation status
- Vulnerable (IUCN 3.1)

Scientific classification
- Kingdom: Animalia
- Phylum: Chordata
- Class: Reptilia
- Order: Squamata
- Suborder: Scinciformata
- Infraorder: Scincomorpha
- Family: Eugongylidae
- Genus: Emoia
- Species: E. erronan

Binomial name
- Emoia erronan Brown, 1991

Species of lizard

The common emo skink or Erronan treeskink (Emoia erronan) is a species of lizard in the family Scincidae. It is found Futuna Island in Vanuatu.
