= Emoia laobaoensis =

Conservation status
- Data Deficient (IUCN 3.1)

Scientific classification
- Kingdom: Animalia
- Phylum: Chordata
- Class: Reptilia
- Order: Squamata
- Family: Scincidae
- Genus: Emoia
- Species: E. laobaoensis

Binomial name
- Emoia laobaoensis Bourret, 1937

Species of lizard

Emoia laobaoensis, Bourret's emo skink or the Laobao mangrove skink, is a species of skink. It is found in Vietnam.
