= Emoia taumakoensis =

Conservation status
- Least Concern (IUCN 3.1)

Scientific classification
- Kingdom: Animalia
- Phylum: Chordata
- Class: Reptilia
- Order: Squamata
- Suborder: Scinciformata
- Infraorder: Scincomorpha
- Family: Eugongylidae
- Genus: Emoia
- Species: E. taumakoensis

Binomial name
- Emoia taumakoensis McCoy & Webber, 1984

Species of lizard

The Taumako emo skink (Emoia taumakoensis) is a species of lizard in the family Scincidae. It is found in the Solomon Islands.
