= Emoia battersbyi =

Conservation status
- Least Concern (IUCN 3.1)

Scientific classification
- Kingdom: Animalia
- Phylum: Chordata
- Class: Reptilia
- Order: Squamata
- Family: Scincidae
- Genus: Emoia
- Species: E. battersbyi

Binomial name
- Emoia battersbyi (Procter, 1923)

Synonyms
- Lygosoma (Emoa) battersbyi Procter, 1923; Lygosoma ahli T. Vogt, 1932; Emoia battersbyi — M.A. Smith, 1937

Species of lizard

Emoia battersbyi, Battersby's emo skink, is a species of lizard in the subfamily Eugongylinae of the family Scincidae. The species is native to Oceania and Southeast Asia.

== Etymology ==
The specific name, battersbyi, is in honour of British herpetologist James Clarence Battersby (1901–1993).

The synonym, Lygosoma ahli, is in honour of German zoologist Ernst Ahl.

== Geographic distribution ==
Emoia battersbyi is found in Indonesia and Papua New Guinea.

== Habitat ==
The preferred natural habitat of Emoia battersbyi is forest, at altitudes from sea level to 1,200 m (3,900 ft).

== Reproduction ==
Emoia battersbyi is oviparous.
