= William George Lawes =

English Congregationalist minister and missionary

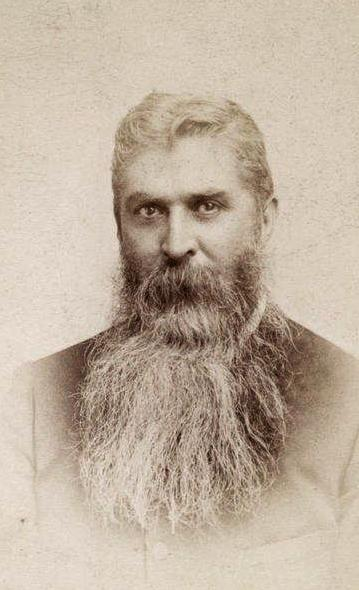
William George Lawes

William George Lawes (1 July 1839 – 6 August 1907) was an English-born Congregationalist minister, missionary and public lecturer. He was regarded as an expert on Papua.

== Life ==
Lawes was born in Aldermaston, Berkshire, the son of Richard Lawes, a tailor, and his wife Mary, née Pickover, and was educated in Mortimer West End. Aged 14, Lawes went to work in Reading, where in 1858 Rev. William Gill came bringing with him a native from the island of Rarotonga. In the same year, Lawes volunteered for service with the London Missionary Society. On 8 November 1860 Lawes married Fanny Wickham and 15 days later they sailed to Savage Island (now Niue).

In 1868, Lawes was joined in Niue by his brother Frank. In 1872, Lawes began a lecture tour in Britain of his missions. Two years later he moved to New Guinea and settled in Port Moresby; his family became the first permanent European residents of Papua. Lawes became an expert in the Motuan language and friend of all the south coast tribes. Lawes served as interpreter for the Protectorate proclamation by James Elphinstone Erskine in 1884. In 1877 a colleague, James Chalmers arrived; Lawes left for England the next on furlough. Lawes had started eleven new missions in Papua and produced the first Papuan-language book. Lawes fought against the abuses in the Pacific labour trade.

In 1885, Lawes was the unofficial adviser to Sir Peter Scratchley in his travel around the Papuan coast. In the same year, Lawes published Grammar and Vocabulary of Language spoken by Motu Tribe, New Guinea. Lawes was also adviser to the colonial governor, William MacGregor.

In 1891, Lawes conducted a lecture tour of the colonies of Australia. In 1894, was awarded a doctorate of divinity by the University of Glasgow on MacGregor's recommendation. Lawes retired in 1906, and moved to Sydney where he died on 6 August 1907.

== Family ==
Lawes was survived by his wife and three of their six children. Lawes' son Frank worked as a government officer in the New Guinea protectorate and colony, he died there in 1894.

== Legacy ==
Lawes is commemorated in the scientific name of a species of South Pacific lizard, Emoia lawesii. 'Lawes Road', in Port Moresby, Papua New Guinea, extending 1.45 kilometres from Champion Parade in Konedobu to the junction with Healy Road near Ela Beach, is named after William George Lawes.
