= Emoia kordoana =

Scientific classification
- Kingdom: Animalia
- Phylum: Chordata
- Class: Reptilia
- Order: Squamata
- Family: Scincidae
- Genus: Emoia
- Species: E. kordoana

Binomial name
- Emoia kordoana (Meyer, 1874)

Synonyms
- Euprepes (Mabuya) kordoanus Meyer, 1874; Euprepes beccari Doria, 1874; Lygosoma iridescens Boulenger, 1897

Species of lizard

Emoia kordoana, also known as Meyer's emo skink, is a species of skink. It is found in New Guinea, the Admiralty Islands, the Bismarck Archipelago, and Sulawesi.
