= Emoia sorex =

Scientific classification
- Kingdom: Animalia
- Phylum: Chordata
- Class: Reptilia
- Order: Squamata
- Family: Scincidae
- Genus: Emoia
- Species: E. sorex

Binomial name
- Emoia sorex (Boettger, 1895)

Species of lizard

The Sorex emo skink (Emoia sorex) is a species of lizard in the family Scincidae. It is found in Indonesia.
