= Emoia tetrataenia =

Conservation status
- Least Concern (IUCN 3.1)

Scientific classification
- Kingdom: Animalia
- Phylum: Chordata
- Class: Reptilia
- Order: Squamata
- Family: Scincidae
- Genus: Emoia
- Species: E. tetrataenia

Binomial name
- Emoia tetrataenia (Boulenger, 1895)

Species of lizard

The four-striped emo skink (Emoia tetrataenia) is a species of lizard in the family Scincidae. It is found in Papua New Guinea and Indonesia.
