= Emoia schmidti =

Conservation status
- Least Concern (IUCN 3.1)

Scientific classification
- Kingdom: Animalia
- Phylum: Chordata
- Class: Reptilia
- Order: Squamata
- Family: Scincidae
- Genus: Emoia
- Species: E. schmidti

Binomial name
- Emoia schmidti W.C. Brown, 1954

Species of lizard

Emoia schmidti, also known commonly as Schmidt's emo skink or Schmidt's skink, is a species of lizard in the family Scincidae. The species is endemic to the Solomon Islands.

== Etymology ==
The specific name, schmidti, is in honor of American herpetologist Karl Patterson Schmidt.

== Habitat ==
The preferred natural habitat of E. schmidti is forest, at altitudes from sea level to 300 m (980 ft).

== Description ==
The holotype of E. schmidti has a snout-to-vent length (SVL) of 5.9 cm (2.3 in).

== Reproduction ==
E. schmidti is oviparous. Clutch size is two eggs.
