= Emoia arnoensis =

Conservation status
- Least Concern (IUCN 3.1)

Scientific classification
- Kingdom: Animalia
- Phylum: Chordata
- Class: Reptilia
- Order: Squamata
- Family: Scincidae
- Genus: Emoia
- Species: E. arnoensis

Binomial name
- Emoia arnoensis (Brown Marshall, 1953

Species of lizard

The Micronesia black skink (Emoia arnoensis) is a species of lizard in the family Scincidae. It is found in Micronesia, likely limited within the Marshall Islands, Nauru, and Kosrae. There is debate on whether the Nauru population is a subspecies, due to its larger amount of middorsal scales.

== Habitat ==
E. arnoensis is strongly terrestrial, typically in thickly weeded or vine covered open habitats.
