= Emoia lawesii =

Conservation status
- Endangered (IUCN 3.1)

Scientific classification
- Kingdom: Animalia
- Phylum: Chordata
- Class: Reptilia
- Order: Squamata
- Family: Scincidae
- Genus: Emoia
- Species: E. lawesii

Binomial name
- Emoia lawesii (Günther, 1874)
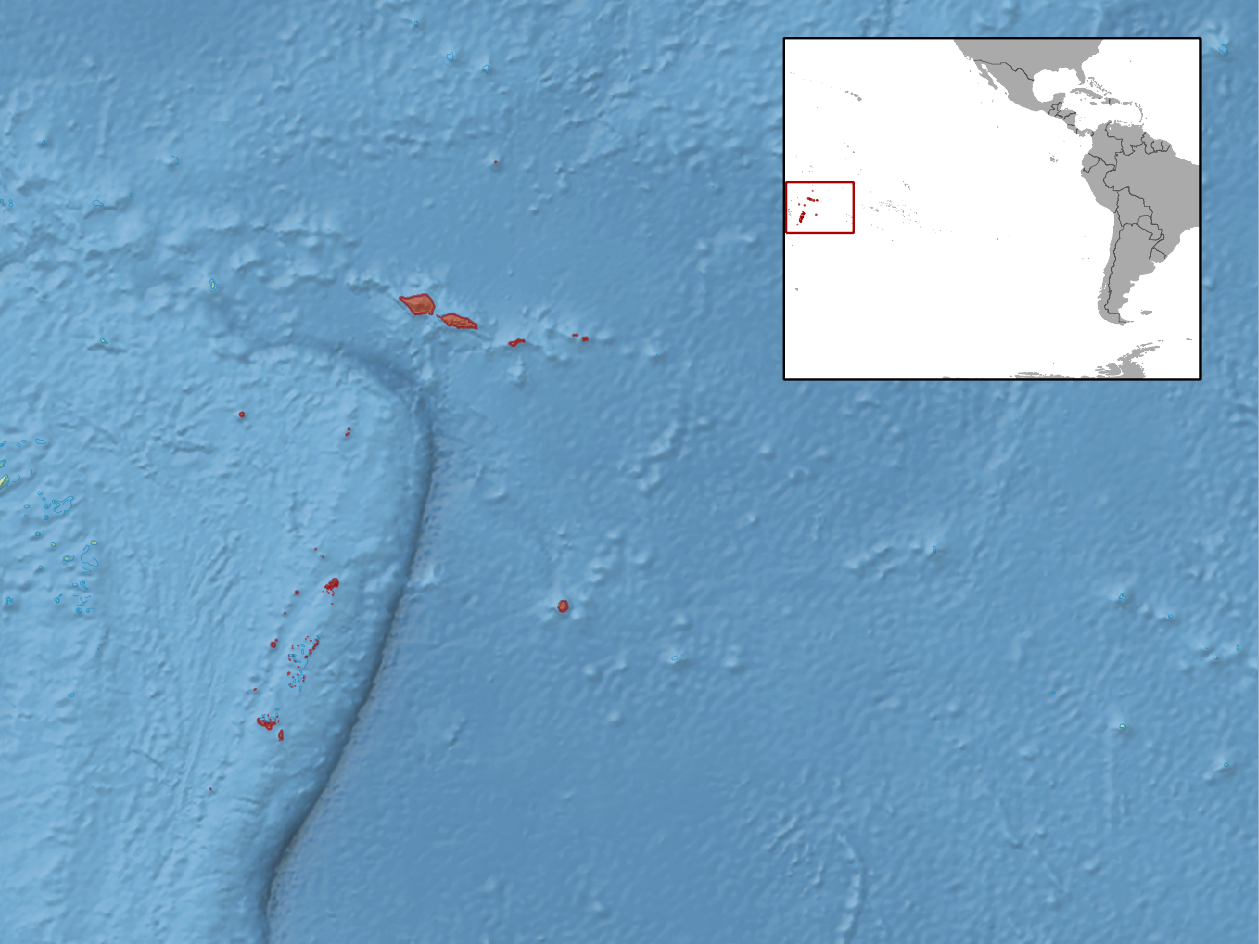

Synonyms
- Mabouia lawesii Günther, 1874; Lygosoma lawesii (Günther, 1874)

Species of lizard

Emoia lawesii, also commonly known as Günther's emo skink and the olive small-scaled skink, is a species of lizard in the subfamily Eugongylinae of the family Scincidae. The species is native to Polynesia.

== Etymology ==
The specific name, lawesii, is in honor of The Reverend William George Lawes (1839–1907), who was an English Christian Missionary on Niue, which at that time was called "Savage Island".

== Geographic range ==
E. lawesii is found in Niue, Samoa, and Tonga.

== Habitat ==
The preferred natural habitat of E. lawesii is forest.

== Reproduction ==
E. lawesii is oviparous.
