= Emoia rufilabialis =

Scientific classification
- Domain: Eukaryota
- Kingdom: Animalia
- Phylum: Chordata
- Class: Reptilia
- Order: Squamata
- Family: Scincidae
- Genus: Emoia
- Species: E. rufilabialis

Binomial name
- Emoia rufilabialis McCoy & Webber, 1984

Species of lizard

The red-lipped emo skink (Emoia rufilabialis) is a species of lizard in the family Scincidae. It is found in the Solomon Islands.
