= Emoia similis =

Scientific classification
- Kingdom: Animalia
- Phylum: Chordata
- Class: Reptilia
- Order: Squamata
- Family: Scincidae
- Genus: Emoia
- Species: E. similis

Binomial name
- Emoia similis Dunn, 1927

Species of lizard

Dunn's emo skink (Emoia similis) is a species of lizard in the family Scincidae. It is found in Indonesia.
