= Emoia callisticta =

Conservation status
- Least Concern (IUCN 3.1)

Scientific classification
- Kingdom: Animalia
- Phylum: Chordata
- Class: Reptilia
- Order: Squamata
- Family: Scincidae
- Genus: Emoia
- Species: E. callisticta

Binomial name
- Emoia callisticta (Peters & Doria, 1878)

Species of lizard

Emoia callisticta is a species of lizard in the family Scincidae. It is found in Indonesia.
