= Emoia aneityumensis =

Conservation status
- Endangered (IUCN 3.1)

Scientific classification
- Kingdom: Animalia
- Phylum: Chordata
- Class: Reptilia
- Order: Squamata
- Suborder: Scinciformata
- Infraorder: Scincomorpha
- Family: Eugongylidae
- Genus: Emoia
- Species: E. aneityumensis

Binomial name
- Emoia aneityumensis Medway, 1974
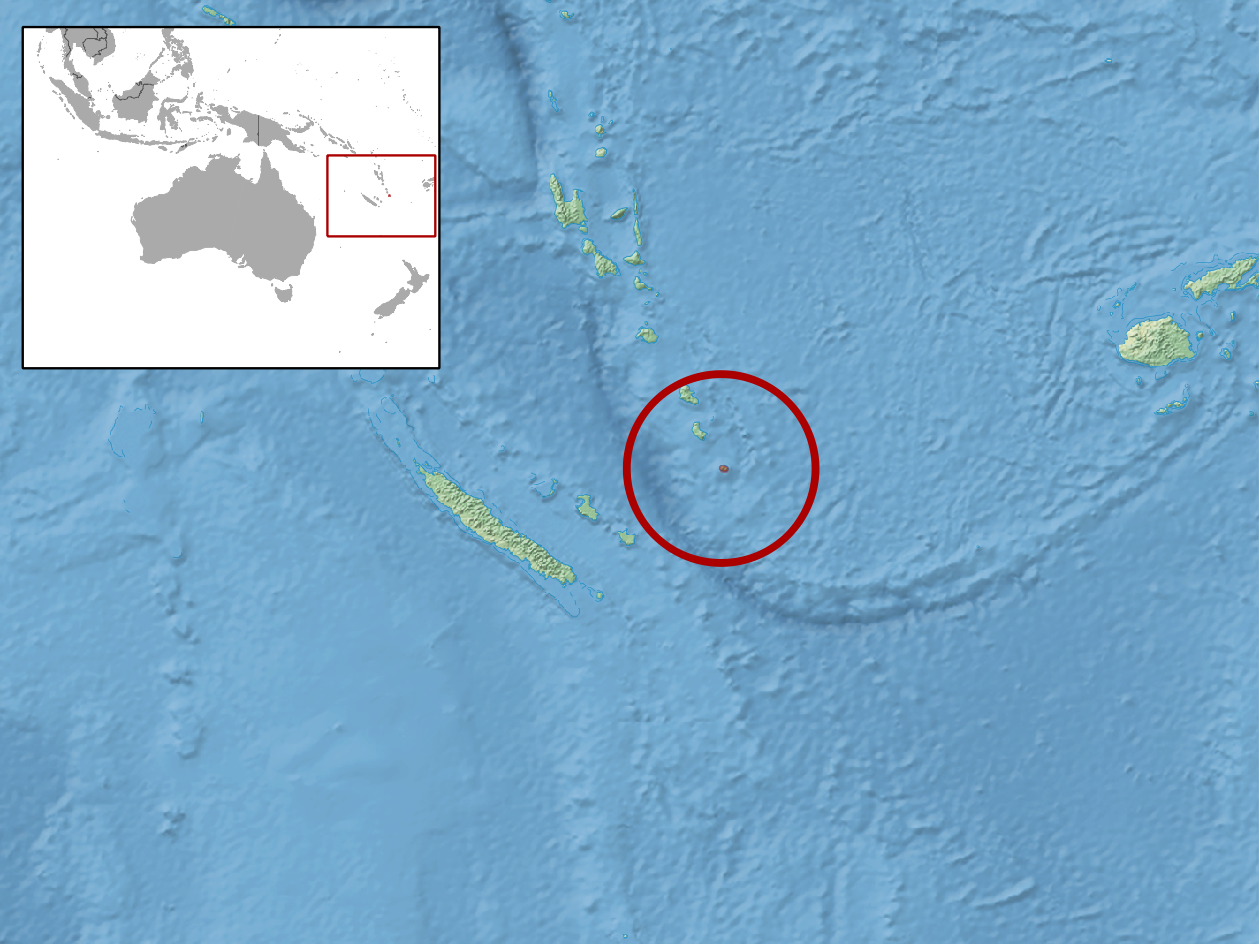

Species of lizard

Emoia aneityumensis, Medway's emo skink or the Anatom emo skink, is a species of lizard in the family Scincidae. It is found in Vanuatu.
