= Emoia oribata =

Conservation status
- Least Concern (IUCN 3.1)

Scientific classification
- Kingdom: Animalia
- Phylum: Chordata
- Class: Reptilia
- Order: Squamata
- Family: Scincidae
- Genus: Emoia
- Species: E. oribata

Binomial name
- Emoia oribata Brown, 1953
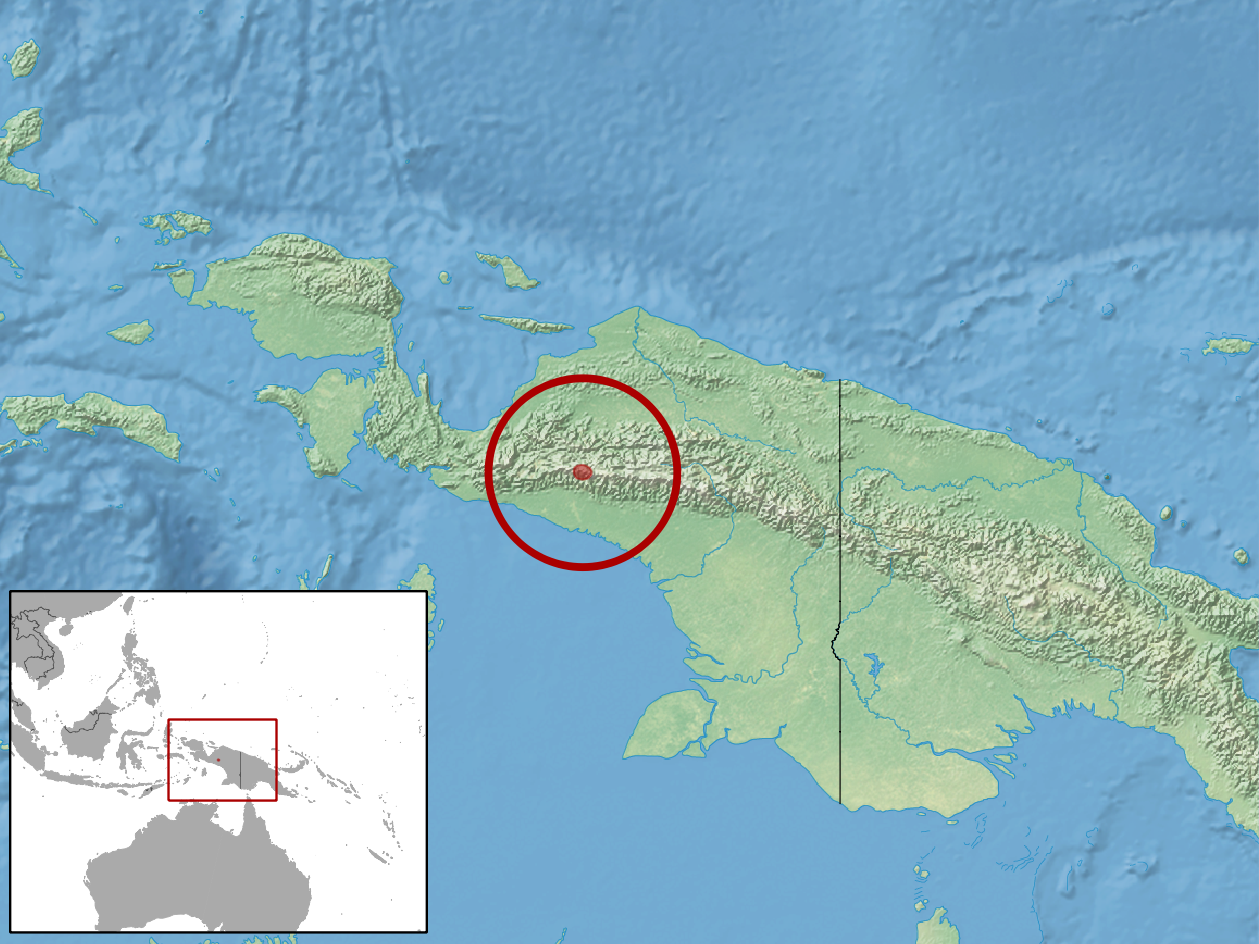

Species of lizard

Emoia oribata is a species of lizard in the family Scincidae. It is found in Papua New Guinea.
