= Emoia bismarckensis =

Conservation status
- Least Concern (IUCN 3.1)

Scientific classification
- Kingdom: Animalia
- Phylum: Chordata
- Class: Reptilia
- Order: Squamata
- Family: Scincidae
- Genus: Emoia
- Species: E. bismarckensis

Binomial name
- Emoia bismarckensis Brown, 1983

Species of lizard

Emoia bismarckensis is a species of lizard in the family Scincidae. It is found on New Britain in Papua New Guinea.
