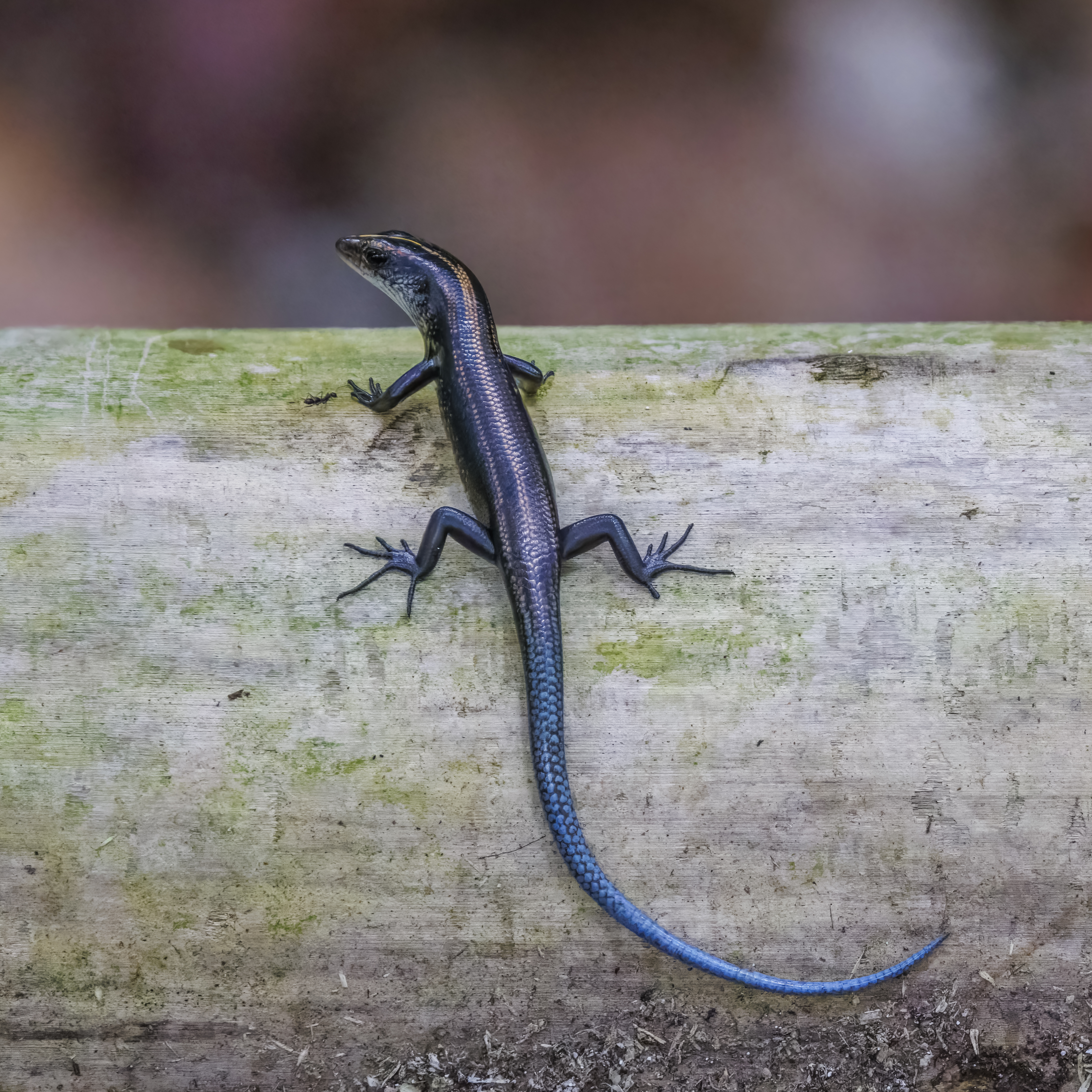
- on Koror, Palau

Conservation status
- Least Concern (IUCN 3.1)

Scientific classification
- Kingdom: Animalia
- Phylum: Chordata
- Class: Reptilia
- Order: Squamata
- Family: Scincidae
- Genus: Emoia
- Species: E. caeruleocauda

Binomial name
- Emoia caeruleocauda (De Vis, 1892)

Synonyms
- Mocoa caeruleocauda De Vis, 1892; Lygosoma cyanurum werneri T. Vogt, 1912; Lygosoma werneri triviale Schüz, 1929; Emoia triviale — Schmidt, 1932; Lygosoma werneri — Angel, 1935; Emoia werneri — Parker, 1936; Emoia caeruleocauda — Greer, 1974

= Emoia caeruleocauda =

Species of lizard

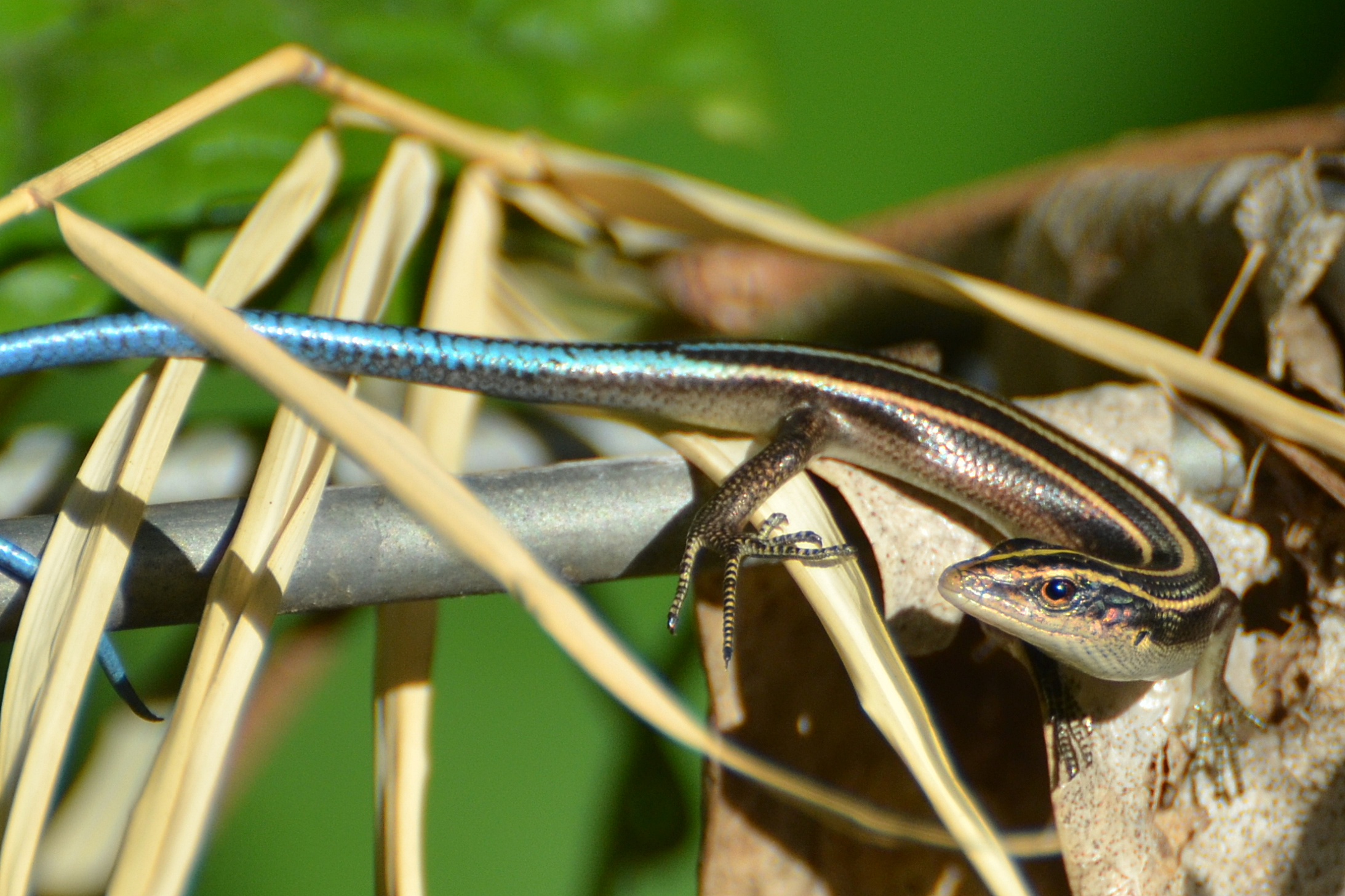

Emoia caeruleocauda, commonly known as the Pacific bluetail skink or Pacific blue-tail skink, is a species of lizard in the family Scincidae. It is widespread in the Indo-West Pacific.

== Geographic range ==
E. caeruleocauda is found widespread from eastern Indonesia (from Sulawesi to east and south) through southern Philippines and New Guinea (Western New Guinea and Papua New Guinea) and the Solomon Islands northward into the Marianas, Carolines, and Marshall Islands, Micronesia, Fiji Islands, Vanuatu, and Guam. It has been reported from Borneo but the IUCN considers this doubtful.

== Habitat ==
Emoia caeruleocauda is essentially terrestrial but it can ascend to forage in low scrub and climb a little distance up tree trunks. It is a lowland species that still can be found as high as 1,500 m (4,900 ft) above sea level.
