= Emoia cyanogaster =

Conservation status
- Least Concern (IUCN 3.1)

Scientific classification
- Kingdom: Animalia
- Phylum: Chordata
- Class: Reptilia
- Order: Squamata
- Family: Scincidae
- Genus: Emoia
- Species: E. cyanogaster

Binomial name
- Emoia cyanogaster (Lesson, 1830)

Synonyms
- Scincus cyanogaster Lesson, 1830; Eumeces carteretii A.M.C. Duméril & Bibron, 1839; Mabuia carteretii — Boulenger, 1886; Lygosoma cyanogaster — Boulenger, 1895; Lygosoma (Keneuxia) dahlii F. Werner, 1898; Emoia cyanogaster — M.A. Smith, 1937; Gongylus carteretii — Frank & Ramus, 1995; Emoia cyanogaster — G. Adler, Austin & Dudley, 1995

Species of lizard

Emoia cyanogaster, the teal emo skink, is a species of lizard in the family Scincidae. The species is found throughout Oceania.

== Habitat ==
The preferred natural habitat of E. cyanogaster is forest, at altitudes from sea level to 600 m (2,000 ft).

== Reproduction ==
E. cyanogaster is oviparous.
