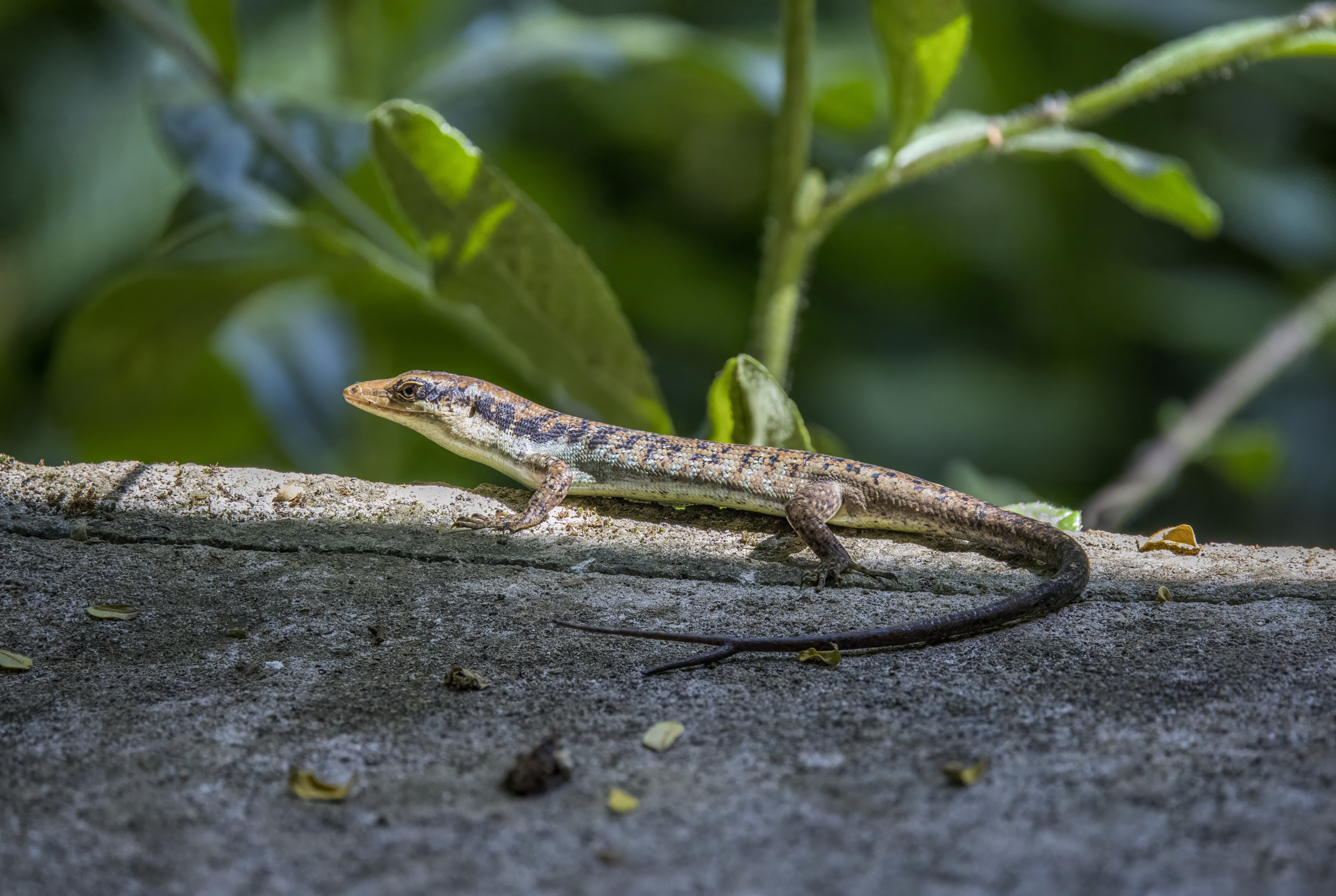

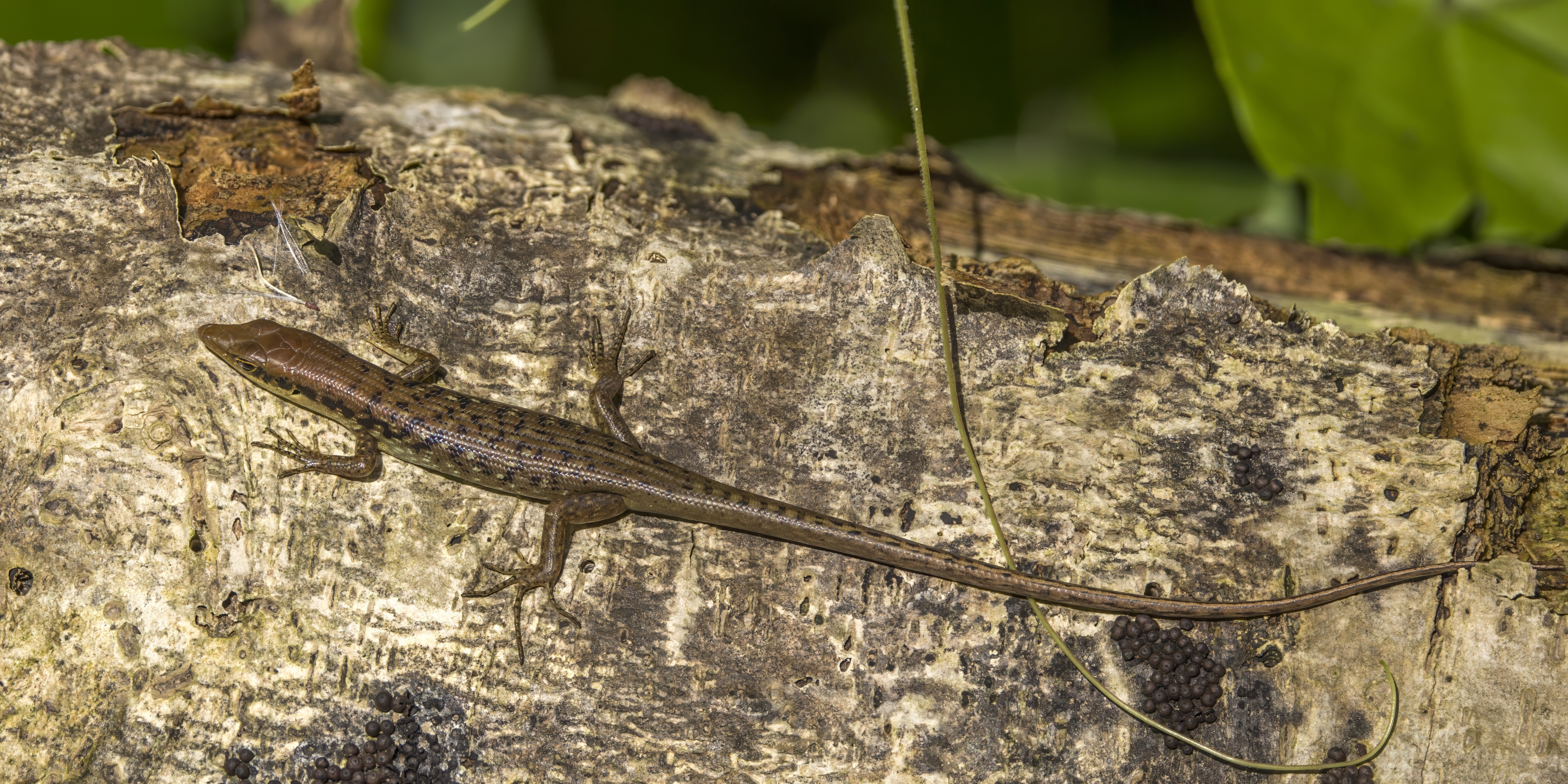

Conservation status
- Vulnerable (IUCN 3.1)

Scientific classification
- Kingdom: Animalia
- Phylum: Chordata
- Class: Reptilia
- Order: Squamata
- Suborder: Scinciformata
- Infraorder: Scincomorpha
- Family: Eugongylidae
- Genus: Emoia
- Species: E. tuitarere

Binomial name
- Emoia tuitarere Zug, Hamilton, & Austin, 2011

= Emoia tuitarere =

Species of lizard

Emoia tuitarere is a species of lizard in the family Scincidae. It is known only from Rarotonga in the Cook Islands. It was scientifically described in 2011.
