= Emoia nigromarginata =

Conservation status
- Least Concern (IUCN 3.1)

Scientific classification
- Kingdom: Animalia
- Phylum: Chordata
- Class: Reptilia
- Order: Squamata
- Suborder: Scinciformata
- Infraorder: Scincomorpha
- Family: Eugongylidae
- Genus: Emoia
- Species: E. nigromarginata

Binomial name
- Emoia nigromarginata (Roux, 1913)

Species of lizard

The black-bordered emo skink or Vanuatu silver vineskink (Emoia nigromarginata) is a species of lizard in the family Scincidae. It is found in Vanuatu.
