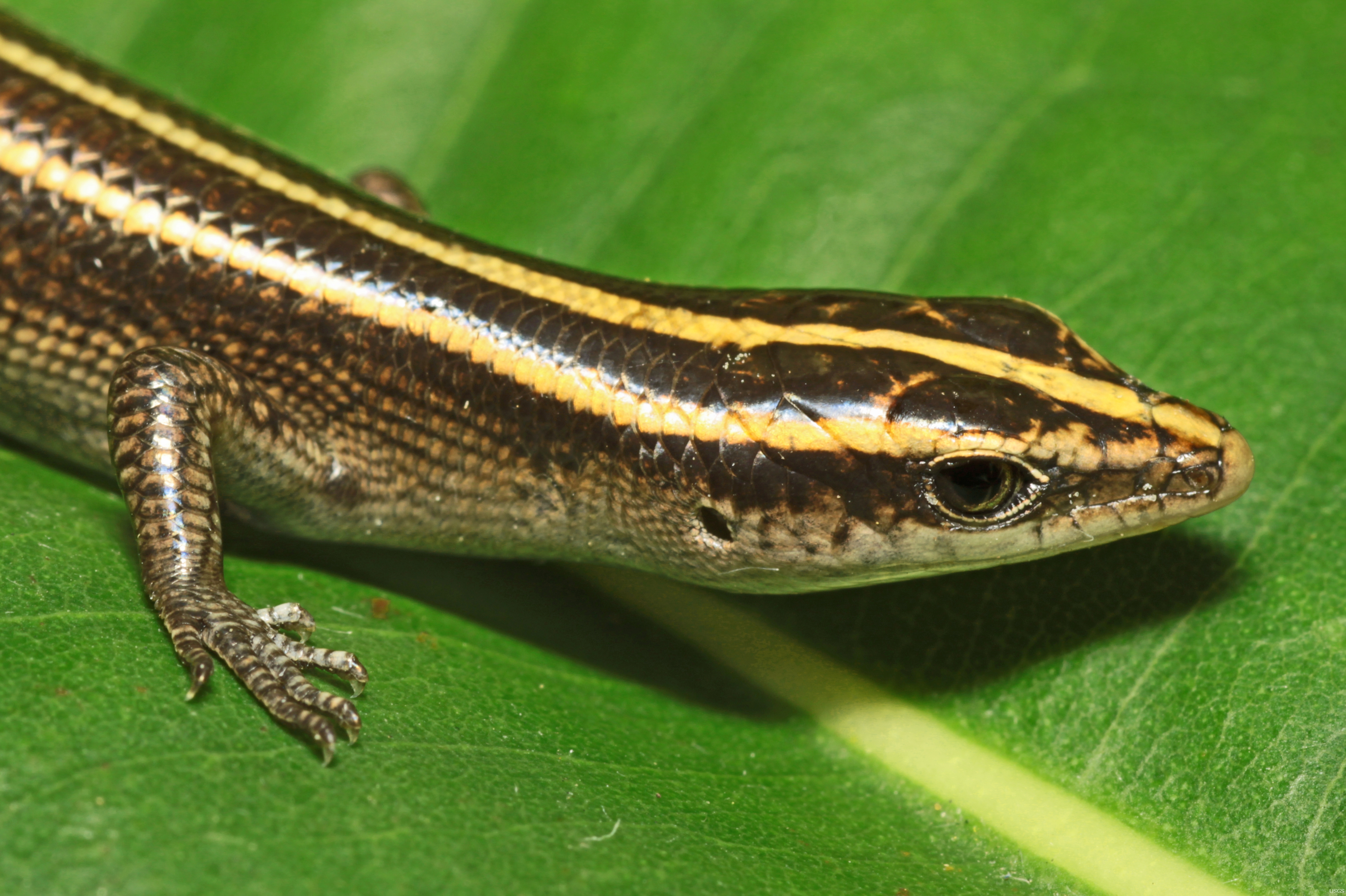
- In Samoa

Conservation status
- Least Concern (IUCN 3.1)

Scientific classification
- Kingdom: Animalia
- Phylum: Chordata
- Class: Reptilia
- Order: Squamata
- Suborder: Scinciformata
- Infraorder: Scincomorpha
- Family: Eugongylidae
- Genus: Emoia
- Species: E. impar

Binomial name
- Emoia impar (Werner, 1898)

Synonyms
- Lygosoma impar Werner, 1898

= Emoia impar =

Species of lizard

Emoia impar, also known as the dark-bellied copper-striped skink, or the azure-tailed skink, is a species of skink that is widespread in the Pacific, especially Polynesia and Micronesia. While common throughout its range, it is threatened by habitat loss, invasive species, and sea level rise due to global warming.

It is a naturalized species in the Hawaiian Islands, most likely introduced by the Polynesians, but has been almost entirely extirpated from there, possibly as a result of the invasive big-headed ant. It disappeared from most islands by the early 20th century, persisting on the Na Pali Coast of Kauaʻi until the 1960s. Alleged sightings on Kauaʻi up to the 1990s were found to have been an introduced population of E. cyanura that was introduced in the 1970s and persisted for up to two decades. While some studies have claimed that it has been entirely extirpated from Hawaii, it actually still persists on the offshore islet of Mōkapu, Molokai, where it has a stable population. It was seen on the big island of Hawaii, in the Kalapana area, in September, 2021. Although some sources claim E. impar to be a native species to Hawaii based on the presence of a single fossil bone, analysis of the sediments the bone was found in indicates it to have a comparatively recent origin. The species was noted to have an extremely dense and thriving population on Flint Island, whose damp palm jungle creates the perfect habitat.
