= Emoia samoensis =

Species of lizard

Emoia samoensis is a species of skink in the family Scincidae. It is found in the South Pacific, including Samoa.

Skinks in the genus Emoia are generally small lizards with smooth scales that live in warm, tropical environments. Species in the E. samoensis group can be told apart by differences in size, scale patterns, and color.

== Taxonomy ==
Emoia samoensis
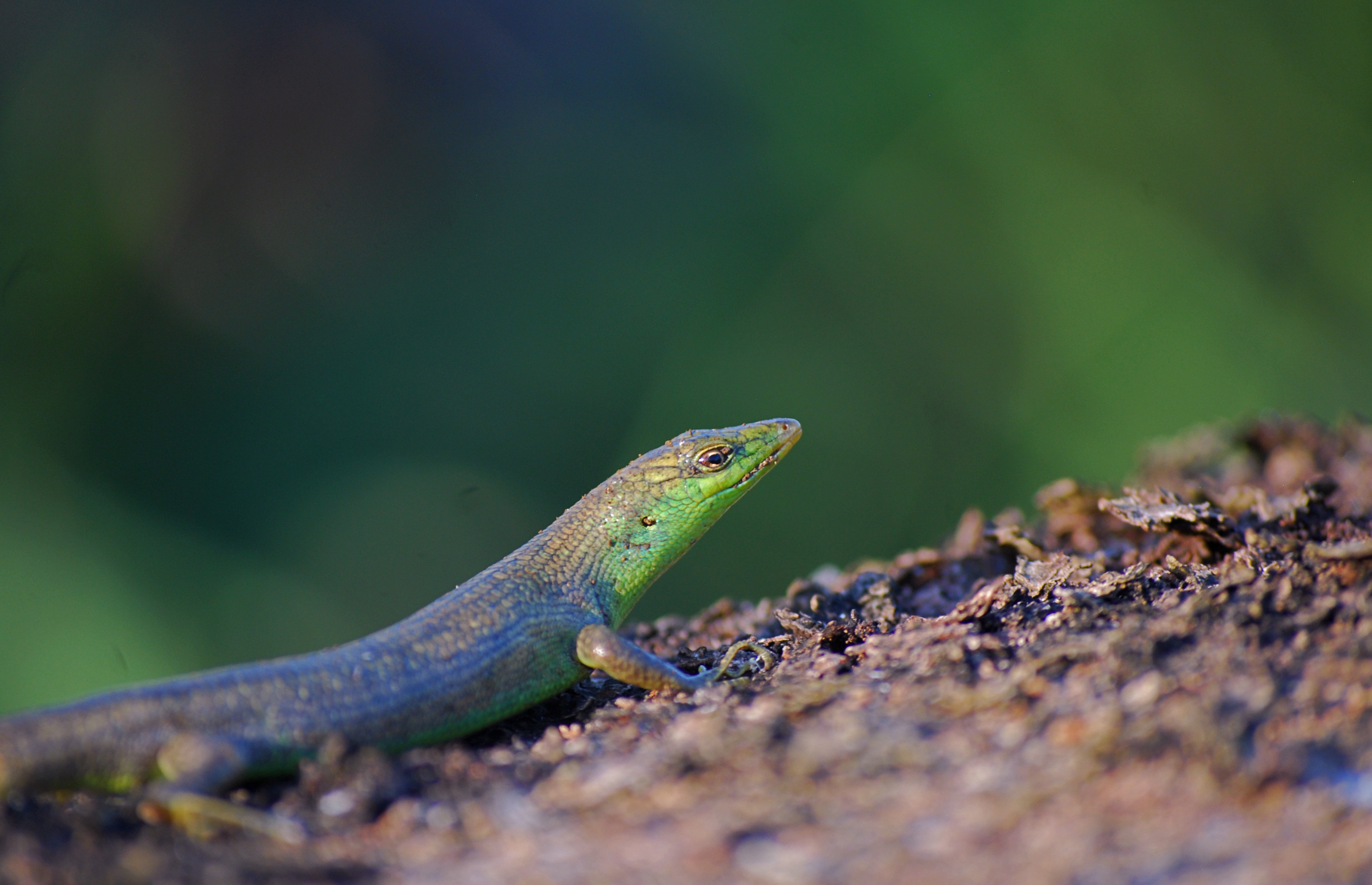

Conservation status
- Endangered (IUCN 3.1)

Scientific classification
- Kingdom: Animalia
- Phylum: Chordata
- Class: Reptilia
- Order: Squamata
- Family: Scincidae
- Genus: Emoia
- Species: E. samoensis

Binomial name
- Emoia samoensis (Duméril, 1851)
- Approximate distribution (Samoan Islands) Range

Emoia samoensis is part of a group of closely related skinks often called the E. samoensis species group. Studies of this group have helped scientists better understand how these species are related and how they can be distinguished from one another.

Research on Pacific island skinks shows that populations on different islands can become different over time because they are separated from each other.

== Distribution and habitat ==
This species is found in the Samoan Islands.

Like other species in the genus Emoia, it lives in tropical island environments.

== Evolution and biogeography ==
Scientists have studied the Emoia samoensis group to understand how these lizards spread between islands. Some populations may have been on certain islands for a long time, while others may have arrived more recently.

These studies help explain how island species form and change over time.

== Conservation status ==
Emoia samoensis is listed as Endangered by the International Union for Conservation of Nature (IUCN).

Because it is only found in a limited area, it may be at risk from environmental changes and other threats to island habitats.

== See also ==
- Emoia
- Scincidae
