= René Léon Bourret =

French zoologist and geologist

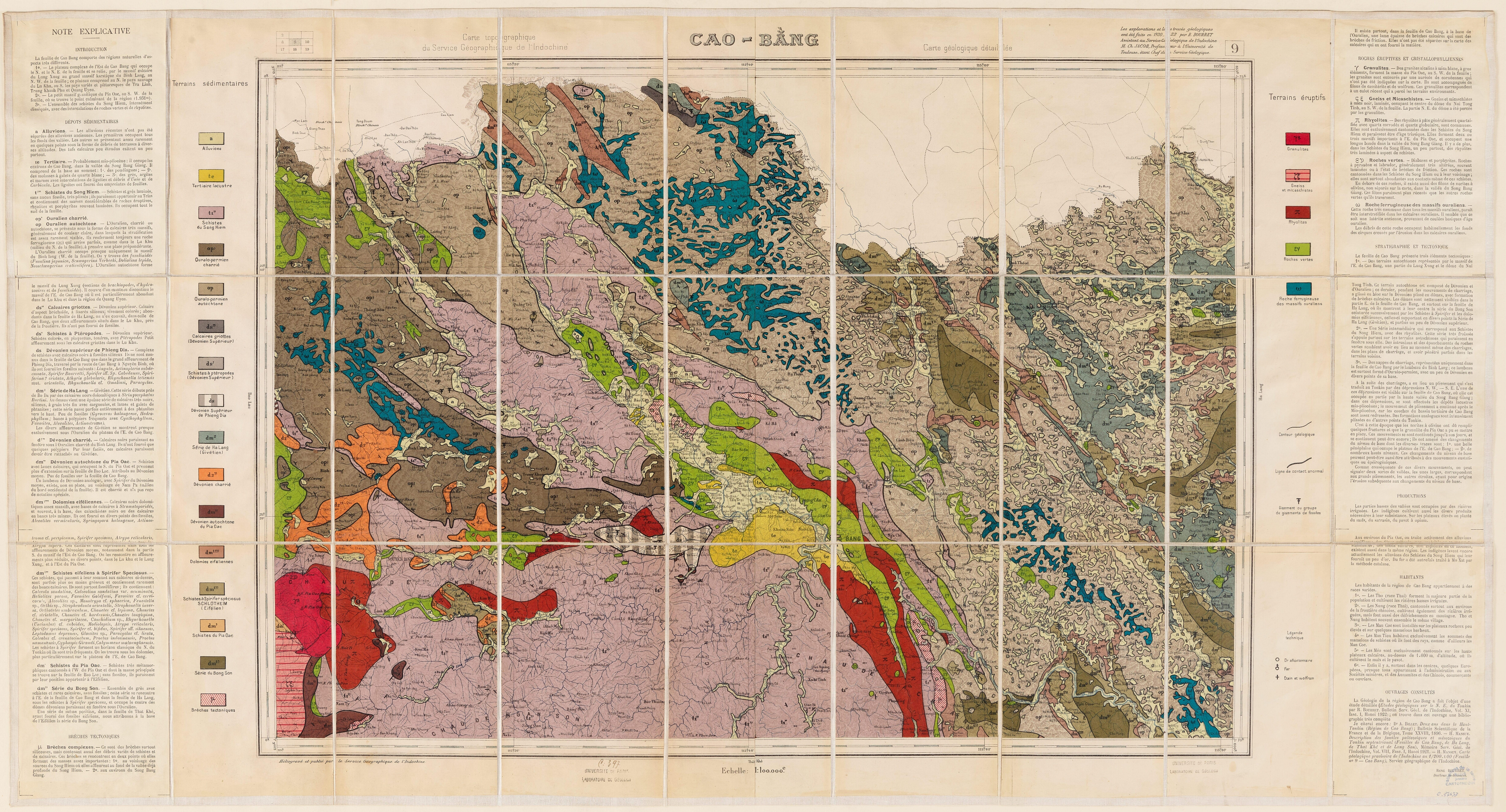
Geological map of Cao-Bằng (Vietnam) in 1922.

René Léon Bourret (28 January 1884, Nérac, (Lot-et-Garonne) – 28 July 1957) was a French herpetologist and geologist.

In 1900, he arrived in French Indochina as a member of the military. Beginning in 1907, he worked as a surveyor for the "cadastral survey". From 1919 to 1925, he performed geological surveys in Indochina, becoming a professor in 1925 at the École Supérieure des Sciences, Université Indochinoise in Hanoi. Two years later, he released his first zoological publication, a general review on vertebrates native to Indochina.

During the ensuing years, he published three major works on herpetofauna native to Indochina: monographs on snakes (1936), chelonians (1941), and amphibians (1942). During the Japanese occupation of Indochina, he remained in Hanoi, where he continued regular publications. In 1947, he returned to France and settled in Toulouse. Most of his specimens are preserved in museums in Toulouse and Paris.

These herpetological species/subspecies are named after him:

- Bourret's blind skink, Dibamus bourreti
- Bourret's box turtle, Cuora bourreti
- Bourret's cat snake, Boiga bourreti
- Bourret's emo skink, Emoia laobaoensis
- Bourret's ground skink, Scincella ochracea
- Bourret's odd-scaled snake, Achalinus ater
- Bourret's pit viper, Protobothrops jerdonii bourreti.

== Selected writings ==
- Études géologiques sur le nord-est du Tonkin, 1922 (dissertation) – Geological studies on northeast Tonkin
- Études géologiques dans la région de Pay-Lay (Moyen Laos), 1925 – Geological studies of the Pay-Lay region (Moyen Laos)
- Les serpents de l'Indochine, 1936 - Snakes of Indochina
- Notes herpetologiques sur l'Indochine francaise : no. 1 + 18-25, 1939-1941 – Herpetological notes on French Indochina.
- Les batraciens de l'Indochine, 1942 – Amphibians of Indochina
- Les mammiféres de l'Indochine : les gibbons, 1947 – Mammals of Indochina, gibbons
- Les lézards de l'Indochine (with Roger Bour) – Lizards of Indochina.

== See also ==
- Category:Taxa named by René Léon Bourret
