= Dick Watling =

Fijian zoologist (born 1951)

Richard (Dick) John Watling (born 13 November 1951) is a Fijian ornithologist, herpetologist, writer and environmental consultant of British origin.

== Life ==
Watling was born in Uganda, spent most of his childhood in East Africa and first went to Fiji in 1967. He studied zoology at Bristol University and then obtained a doctorate at Cambridge, his doctoral thesis concerning the red-vented bulbul, a bird introduced to Fiji where it is an agricultural pest. He has worked in the Lake Manyara and Serengeti National Parks in Tanzania and with the World Wildlife Fund's Conservation Indonesia Programme as well as at many places throughout the south-west Pacific and south-east Asian regions. He has also served as editor of Domodomo, the journal of the Fiji Museum. and was the principal founder of NatureFiji-MareqetiViti, which is Fiji's only domestic NGO working solely for the conservation of Fiji's natural heritage

== Publications ==
Books authored or coauthored by Watling include:

- 1982 – Birds of Fiji, Tonga and Samoa. (Illustrated by Chloe Talbot-Kelly). Millwood: New Zealand. ISBN 978-0-908582-36-5
- 1986 – Mai Veikau: Tales of Fijian Wildlife. Fiji Times: Suva.
- 1999 – Pocket Poster Guide to the Birds of Fiji. Author: Fiji. ISBN 978-982-9030-02-3
- 2001 – A Guide to the Birds of Fiji and Western Polynesia: Including American Samoa, Niue, Samoa, Tokelau, Tonga, Tuvalu and Wallis and Futuna. Author: Fiji. ISBN 978-982-9030-04-7
- 2005 – Palms of the Fiji Islands. (With George Bennett). Environmental Consultants: Suva. ISBN 978-982-9047-02-1
- 2006 – Guide to the Birds of the Kingdom of Tonga. Author: Fiji. ISBN 978-982-9030-07-8
