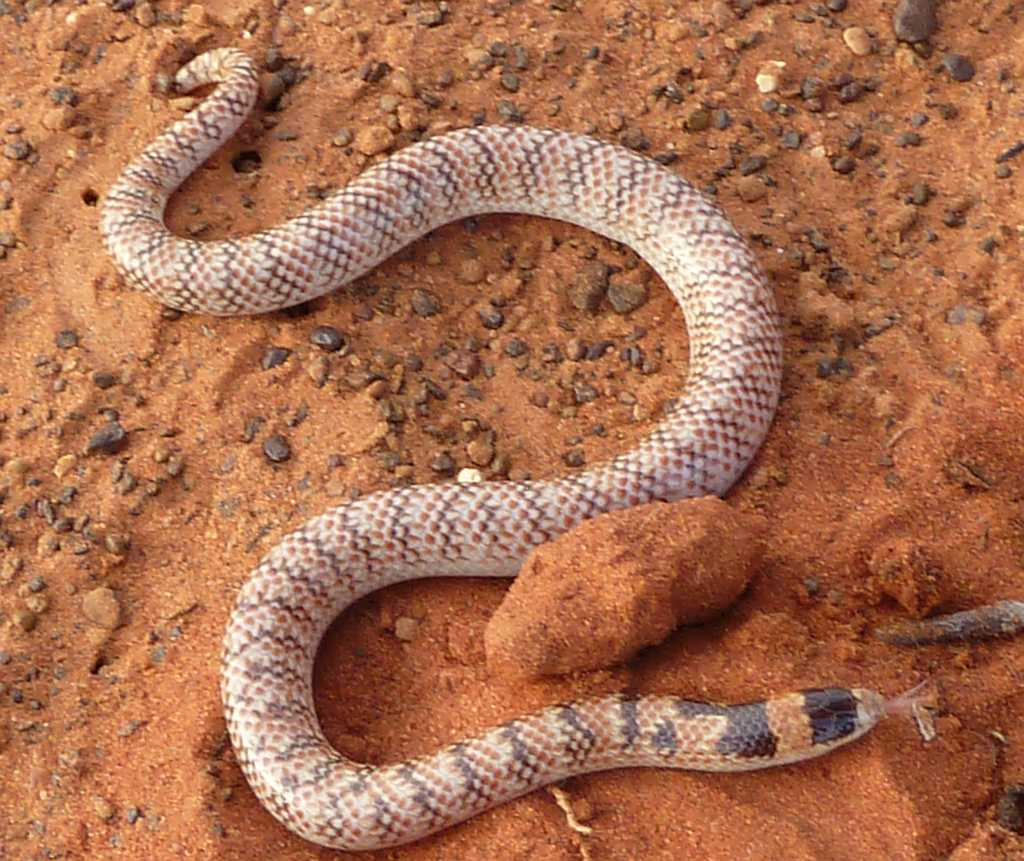
- Simoselaps fasciolatus

Scientific classification
- Domain: Eukaryota
- Kingdom: Animalia
- Phylum: Chordata
- Class: Reptilia
- Order: Squamata
- Suborder: Serpentes
- Family: Elapidae
- Subfamily: Hydrophiinae
- Genus: Simoselaps; Jan, 1859

= Simoselaps =

Genus of snakes

Simoselaps, or Australian coral snakes, is a genus composed of 12 species of venomous elapid snakes.

== Geographic range ==
Species of the genus Simoselaps are found throughout Australia.

== Description ==
Australian coral snakes are small snakes. They have smooth and polished scales, shovel-shaped snouts, and are brightly marked with bands or annuli.

== Habitat and behavior ==
Species of Simoselaps are found mainly in arid regions. They are burrowing snakes which move beneath the surface through loose sand or soil. At night they come to the surface to feed on small lizards and reptile eggs.

== Reproduction ==
All species of Australian coral snakes are oviparous and lay clutches of three to five eggs.

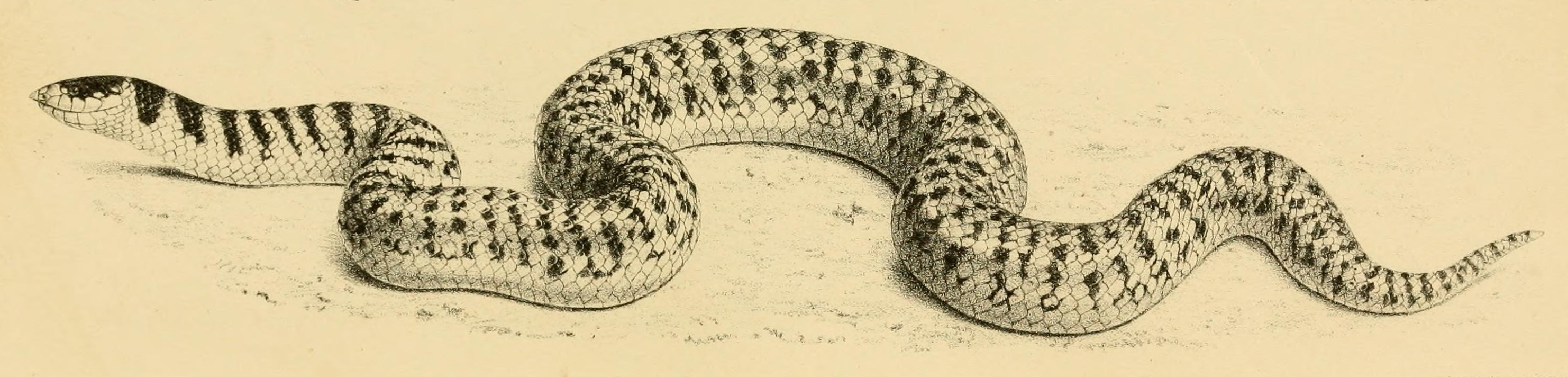
Simoselaps fasciolatus

== Species ==
Species	Authority	Subsp.	Common name	Geographic range
S. anomalus	(Sternfeld, 1919)	None	northern desert banded snake	Australia (Northern Territory, South and Western Australia)
S. approximans	(Glauert, 1954)	None	north-western shovel-nosed snake	Western Australia
S. australis	(Krefft, 1864)	None	Australian coral snake	South Australia, New South Wales, Queensland and Victoria
S. bertholdi	(Jan, 1864)	None	desert banded snake	Australia
S. calonotus	(A.M.C. Duméril, Bibron & A.H.A. Duméril, 1854)	None	black-striped burrowing snake	Western Australia
S. fasciolatus	(Günther, 1872)	2	narrow-banded shovel-nosed snake	South and Western Australia, New South Wales, Northern Territory and Queensland
S. incinctus	(Storr, 1968)	None	unbanded shovel-nosed snake	Australia: Northern Territory and Queensland
S. littoralis	(Storr, 1968)	None	west-coast banded snake	Western Australia
S. minimus	(Worrell, 1960)	None	Dampierland burrowing snake	Western Australia
S. morrisi	Horner, 1998	None	Arnhem shovel-nosed snake	Australia:Northern Territory
S. roperi	(Kinghorn, 1931)	None	northern shovel-nosed snake	Western Australia, Kimberley Region and Northern Territory
S. semifasciatus	(Günther, 1863)	3	southern shovel-nosed snake, half-girdled snake	Western Australia, Northern Territory, South Australia and Queensland

Several of the above species are sometimes placed in the genera Brachyurophis or Neelaps.
