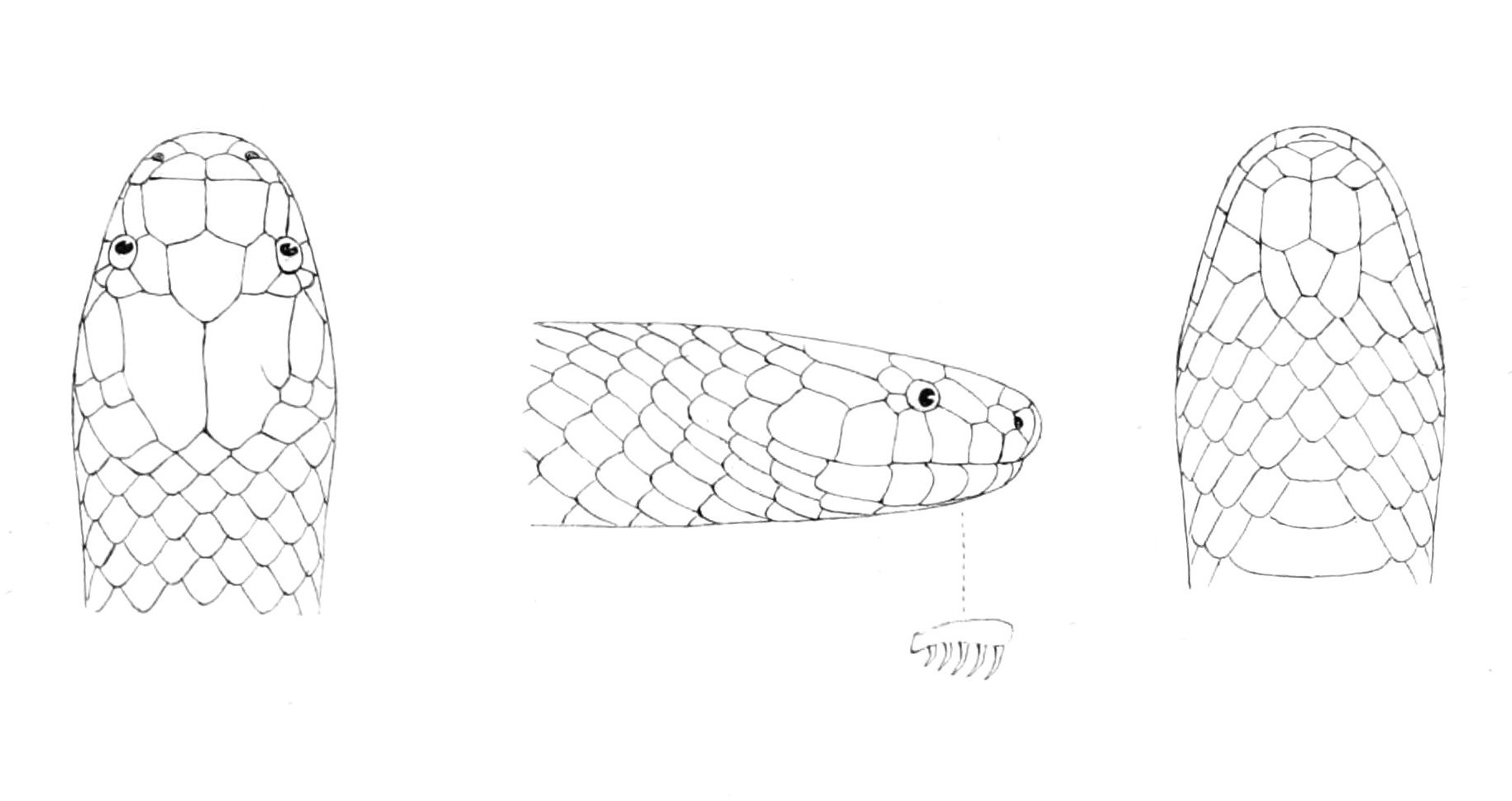

Scientific classification
- Kingdom: Animalia
- Phylum: Chordata
- Class: Reptilia
- Order: Squamata
- Suborder: Serpentes
- Family: Elapidae
- Subfamily: Hydrophiinae
- Genus: Toxicocalamus; Boulenger, 1896

= Toxicocalamus =

Genus of snakes

Toxicocalamus is a genus of snakes in the family Elapidae. The genus is endemic to New Guinea.

== Description ==
Most species of Toxicocalamus are relatively small, the largest specimen known being the holotype of the recently described Toxicocalamus ernstmayri, which measures 1.1 m (43 in) snout-to-vent length (SVL) and 1.2 m (47 in) in total length (TTL). The second longest is the holotype of T. grandis, which measures 0.88 m (35 in) SVL, 0.98 m (39 in) TTL. Most species are under 0.80 m (31 in) TTL, and several are the thickness of bootlaces. In general females have longer bodies than males, but much shorter tails.

== Venom ==
Members of genus Toxicocalamus are venomous, with fixed front-fangs (a dental arrangement known as proteroglyphous), but are not known to be a threat to humans, being unaggressive, of modest size, and secretive. However, the venom of T. longissimus is believed to be fairly toxic, since it contains three-finger toxins (3FTx), Type-I phospholipase A_{2} (PLA_{2}) and snake venom metalloproteinase (SVMP), while T. buergersi possesses long venom glands than extend backwards into the body cavity.

== Behaviour ==
Although most species of Toxicocalamous are believed to be diurnal, they are fossorial, or semi-fossorial, in habit and rarely encountered.

== Geographic range ==
Many species of Toxicocalamus are localised in their distribution and associated with particular islands or mountain ranges. Several species are poorly known, with four known only from their holotypes. Toxicocalamus is probably not closely related to the Australian Elapidae, being endemic to the island of New Guinea, northern coastal offshore islands, i.e. Seleo Is. (Sandaun Province, PNG); Walis Is. and Tarawai Is. (East Sepik Province, PNG), and Karkar Is. (Madang Province, PNG), and the archipelagoes of Milne Bay Province to the southeast, i.e. d'Entrecasteaux Archipelago (Goodenough Is., Fergusson Is., and Normanby Is.), Woodlark Is., and the Louisiade Archipelago (Misima Is., Sudest Is., and Rossel Is.).

== Diet ==
The prey of snakes in the genus Toxicocalamus appears to consist almost entirely of earthworms, particularly the giant earthworms of the Megascolecidae, hence the adoption of the term "worm-eating snakes" for species within this genus.

== Reproduction ==
In common with other tropical elapids, Toxicocalamus is believed to reproduce by oviparity, with clutch sizes of 3–7 recorded, dependent on species and size of the female.

== Natural history ==
The natural history of many species of Toxicocalamus is almost entirely undocumented, due to a paucity of specimens and the infrequence of their encounter in the field.

== Species ==
The following 24 species, one of which has two subspecies, are currently recognised as being valid in the genus Toxicocalamus:

- Toxicocalamus atratus Kraus, Kaiser & O’Shea, 2022 – black forest snake
- Toxicocalamus buergersi (Sternfeld, 1913) – Buergers' forest snake, Torricelli Mountains snake
- Toxicocalamus cratermontanus Kraus, 2017 – Crater Mountain snake
- Toxicocalamus ernstmayri O'Shea, Parker & Kaiser, 2015 – Star Mountains snake, Star Mountains worm-eating snake
- Toxicocalamus goodenoughensis Roberts & Austin, 2020
- Toxicocalamus grandis (Boulenger, 1914) – Setakwa River snake, Setekwa River forest snake
- Toxicocalamus holopelturus McDowell, 1969 – Mt. Rossel forest snake, Rossel Island snake
- Toxicocalamus lamingtoni Kinghorn, 1928 – Mount Lamington forest snake
- Toxicocalamus loennbergii Boulenger, 1908 – Lönnberg’s forest snake
- Toxicocalamus longhagen Roberts, Iova & Austin, 2022
- Toxicocalamus longissimus Boulenger, 1896 – Fergusson Island forest snake, Woodlark forest snake, Woodlark Island snake
- Toxicocalamus loriae (Boulenger, 1898) – common worm-eating snake, Loria forest snake
- Toxicocalamus mattisoni Kraus, 2020
- Toxicocalamus mintoni Kraus, 2009 – Minton's forest snake, Sudest Island snake
- Toxicocalamus misimae McDowell, 1969 – Misima Island forest snake, Misima Island snake
- Toxicocalamus nigrescens Kraus, 2017 – Fergusson Island worm-eating snake
- Toxicocalamus nymani (Lönnberg, 1900) – Loria forest snake
- Toxicocalamus pachysomus Kraus, 2009 – Cloudy Mountains worm-eating snake
- Toxicocalamus preussi (Sternfeld, 1913) – Preuss's forest snake, Preuss' slender worm-eating snake

- Toxicocalamus preussi preussi (Sternfeld, 1913) – Preuss's Sepek forest snake, Preuss' slender worm-eating snake
- Toxicocalamus preussi angusticinctus Bogert & Matalas, 1945 – Fly River forest snake, Fly River slender worm-eating snake

- Toxicocalamus pumehanae O'Shea, Allison & Kaiser, 2018 – Managalas Plateau snake
- Toxicocalamus spilolepidotus McDowell, 1969 – Krakte Mountains spotted snake, spotted forest snake
- Toxicocalamus spilorhynchus Kraus, Kaiser & O’Shea, 2022
- Toxicocalamus stanleyanus Boulenger, 1903 – Owen Stanley Mountains snake, Owen Stanley Range forest snake
- Toxicocalamus vertebralis Kraus, Kaiser & O’Shea, 2022 – striped forest snake

Nota bene: A binomial authority in parentheses indicates that the species was originally described in a genus other than Toxicocalamus. These former genera, Apistocalamus, Apisthocalamus, Pseudapistocalamus, Pseudapisthocalamus, Ultrocalamus, and Vanapina, are now synonyms of Toxicocalamus.

== Taxonomy ==
The former species Pseudapisthocalamus nymani Lönnberg, 1900; Apisthocalamus pratti Boulenger, 1904; A. loennbergii Boulenger, 1908; and A. lamingtoni Kinghorn, 1928; are synonyms of T. loriae, Vanapina lineata De Vis, 1905 is a synonym of T. longissimus, and Ultrocalamus latisquamatus Schüz, 1929 is a synonym of T. preussi.

Most of the described species are poorly known and rarely encountered. The most widely distributed, and most commonly encountered, species is T. loriae (itself a possible species complex), which accounts for 66% of all Toxicocalamus specimens in museum collections. T. loriae is frequently encountered in the Highlands, where large numbers have been collected in village gardens along the Wahgi River valley of Simbu Province, PNG. The next most frequently encountered and widely distributed species are T. preussi and T. stanleyanus. All the other species are much less well known and localised in distribution.

Also on mainland New Guinea, T. buergersi is known from only six specimens, from the Torricelli Mountains in the Sepik region (Sandaun and East Sepik Provinces), PNG; T. spilolepidotus is known from two specimens, from the Kratke Range, Eastern Highlands Province, PNG; T. pachysomus is known from its holotype, from the Cloudy Mountains, Milne Bay Province; PNG, T. cratermontanus from its holotype, from Crater Mountain, Simbu Province, PNG, while T. ernstmayri was only known from its holotype in the Star Mountains of Western Province, PNG, until a second specimen was observed crawling across mine-workings at the Ok Tedi Mine, in the Star Mountains. Toxicocalamus grandis is also only known from its holotype, collected on the Setakwa River, western New Guinea, in 1912, (the only species represented by a type specimen west of the WNG/PNG border), and T. pumehanae is also only known from its holotype, from the Managalas Plateau, Oro Province, PNG,.

On the islands of Milne Bay, T. holopelturus is known from 19 specimens from Rossel Island, also known as Yela; T. misimae is known from six specimens from Misima Island; and T. mintoni is only known from its holotype, from Sudest Island, also known as Vanantai or Tagula Island, all in the Louisiade Archipelago. Toxicocalamus nigrescens is only known from its holotype and paratype, from Fergusson Island, in the d'Entercasteaux Archipelago, while T. longissimus is known from 12 specimens from Woodlark Island.
