= Shovel-nosed snake =

Shovel-nosed snake or shovelnose snake may refer to:

- Brachyurophis, a genus of snakes found in Australia
- Sonora, a genus of snakes found in North America
