= Toxicocalamus goodenoughensis =

Scientific classification
- Kingdom: Animalia
- Phylum: Chordata
- Class: Reptilia
- Order: Squamata
- Suborder: Serpentes
- Family: Elapidae
- Genus: Toxicocalamus
- Species: T. goodenoughensis

Binomial name
- Toxicocalamus goodenoughensis Roberts and Austin, 2020

Species of venomous snake

Toxicocalamus goodenoughensis is a species of venomous snake in the family Elapidae. It is endemic to Goodenough Island in New Guinea. The snake was first collected in 2012 and described to science as a new species in 2020.

== Description ==
Toxicocalamus goodenoughensis is approximately 691 mm (27.2 in) in length. The body is uniformly a slightly iridescent dark gray-brown color, outside of mottled yellow coloration around the face and neck.

Little is known about its behavior outside of outward similarities to other members of Toxicocalamus, such as feeding on earthworms and living primarily subterranean lives. It can be differentiated from other members of its genus by differences in its facial scales and subcaudals.

== Etymology ==
The specific name, goodenoughensis, refers to Goodenough island, where it was discovered and is currently the only place that it has been observed.

== Taxonomic evaluation ==
Toxicocalamus goodenoughensis was described from two specimens, the holotype and paratype in 2020. It was published in the Journal of Herpetology, a journal of the Society for the Study of Amphibians and Reptiles.

Toxicocalamus goodenoughensis was found to form a clade with T. nigrescens, sister to the T. loriae clade and a T. pachysomus clade.
