= Toxicocalamus longhagen =

Scientific classification
- Kingdom: Animalia
- Phylum: Chordata
- Class: Reptilia
- Order: Squamata
- Suborder: Serpentes
- Family: Elapidae
- Genus: Toxicocalamus
- Species: T. longhagen

Binomial name
- Toxicocalamus longhagen Roberts, Iova & Austin, 2022

Species of venomous snake

Toxicocalamus longhagen is a species of venomous snake in the family Elapidae. It is endemic to Mount Hagen in New Guinea. The snake was first collected in 1967 and described to science as a new species in 2022.

== Description ==
Toxicocalamus longhagen is approximately 566 mm (22.3 in) in length and 12.8 mm (0.5 in) in width. The color in life is currently unknown due to the holotype's longtime preservation in 70% ethanol. It can be distinguished from other members of the genus through its facial scale differences and subcaudals.

== Etymology ==
The specific name longhagen comes from the Tok Pisin word "long", meaning 'from', with "hagen" referring to the location of the specimen, Mount Hagen.

== Taxonomic evaluation ==
Differences in the postfrontal bones distinguish it from T. loriae. The species has been suggested to be a nomen dubium.
