= Acacia kingiana =

Conservation status
- Extinct (EPBC Act)

Scientific classification
- Kingdom: Plantae
- Clade: Embryophytes
- Clade: Tracheophytes
- Clade: Spermatophytes
- Clade: Angiosperms
- Clade: Eudicots
- Clade: Rosids
- Order: Fabales
- Family: Fabaceae
- Subfamily: Caesalpinioideae
- Clade: Mimosoid clade
- Genus: Acacia
- Species: †A. kingiana

Binomial name
- †Acacia kingiana Maiden & Blakely

Extinct species of legume

Acacia kingiana was a species of flowering plant in the family Fabaceae and was endemic to an area north-east of Wagin in the south-west of Western Australia. It was a bushy shrub with narrowly oblong to narrowly elliptic phyllodes, and spherical heads of presumably yellow flowers.

== Description ==
Acacia kingiana was a bushy shrub that typically grew to a height of 2–3 m (6 ft 7 in – 9 ft 10 in) and had branchlets covered with woolly hairs. Its phyllodes were narrowly oblong to narrowly elliptic, straight to slightly curved, about 10 mm (0.39 in) long and 2–3 mm (0.079–0.118 in) wide and leathery, with two or three main veins. The flowers were presumably yellow, borne in a raceme 1.5–2 mm (0.059–0.079 in) long with spherical heads on peduncles 3.5–4.0 mm (0.14–0.16 in) long.

== Taxonomy ==
Acacia kingiana was first formally described in 1927 by Joseph Maiden and William Faris Blakely in the Journal of the Royal Society of Western Australia from specimens collected by Charles Gardner in 1923, 10 mi (16 km) north-east of Wagin in wandoo forest. The specific epithet (kingiana) honours Ethel A. King.

== Distribution and habitat ==
This species of wattle is only known from the type collection north-east of Wagin, where it grew in gravelly soil in wandoo forest.

== Conservation status ==
Acacia kingiana is presumed extinct under the Australian Government Environment Protection and Biodiversity Conservation Act 1999 and the Western Australian Government Biodiversity Conservation Act 2016.

== See also ==
- List of Acacia species
