= Simoselaps minimus =

Conservation status
- Least Concern (IUCN 3.1)

Scientific classification
- Kingdom: Animalia
- Phylum: Chordata
- Class: Reptilia
- Order: Squamata
- Suborder: Serpentes
- Family: Elapidae
- Genus: Simoselaps
- Species: S. minimus

Binomial name
- Simoselaps minimus (Worrell, 1960)

Synonyms
- Melwardia minima Worrell 1960; Vermicella minima – Storr 1978

Species of Australian snake

Simoselaps minimus, also known as the Dampierland burrowing snake, is a species of mildly venomous burrowing snake that is endemic to Australia. The specific epithet minimus ("least") refers to the species' relatively small size.

== Description ==
The species grows to an average of about 22 cm in length. It has a pale brown upper body, cream snout, and two black blotches on head and nape.

== Behaviour ==
The species is oviparous.

== Distribution and habitat ==
The species occurs in the Dampierland bioregion of the western Kimberley region of Western Australia, where the characteristic habitat is pindan woodland. The type locality is Broome.
