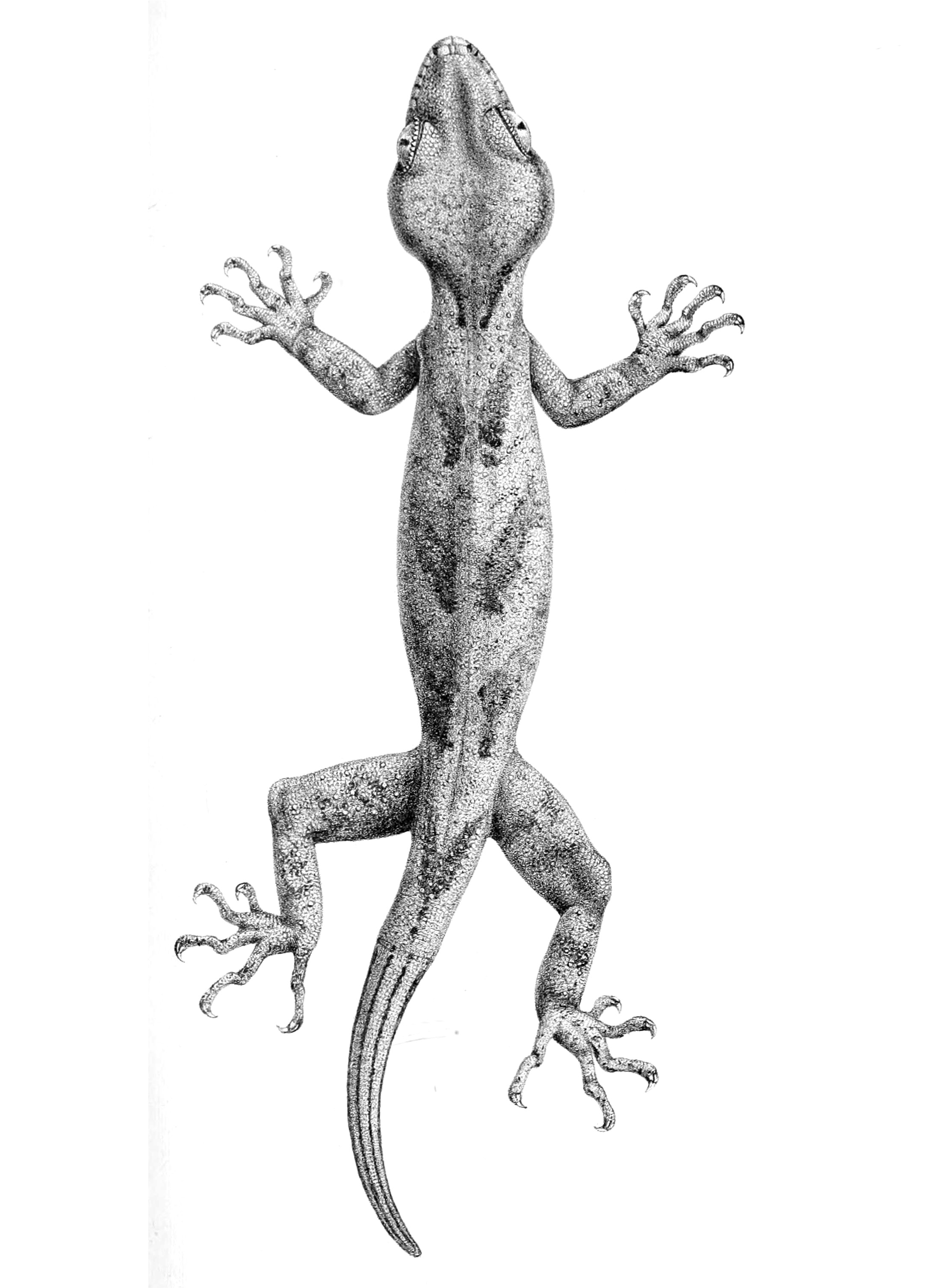
- Cyrtodactylus loriae

Conservation status
- Least Concern (IUCN 3.1)

Scientific classification
- Kingdom: Animalia
- Phylum: Chordata
- Class: Reptilia
- Order: Squamata
- Suborder: Gekkota
- Family: Gekkonidae
- Genus: Cyrtodactylus
- Species: C. loriae

Binomial name
- Cyrtodactylus loriae (Boulenger, 1897)

Synonyms
- Gymnodactylus loriae Boulenger, 1897; Cyrtodactylus loriae — W.C. Brown & F. Parker, 1973; Gonydactylus loriae — Kluge, 1991; Cyrtodactylus loriae — Rösler, 2000

= Boulenger's bow-fingered gecko =

Species of lizard

Boulenger's bow-fingered gecko (Cyrtodactylus loriae) is a species of gecko, a lizard in the family Gekkonidae. The species is endemic to Papua New Guinea.

== Etymology ==
The specific name, loriae, is in honor of Italian ethnologist Lamberto Loria.

== Habitat ==
The preferred natural habitat of C. loriae is forest, at altitudes of 500–1,500 m (1,600–4,900 ft).

== Reproduction ==
C. loriae is oviparous.
