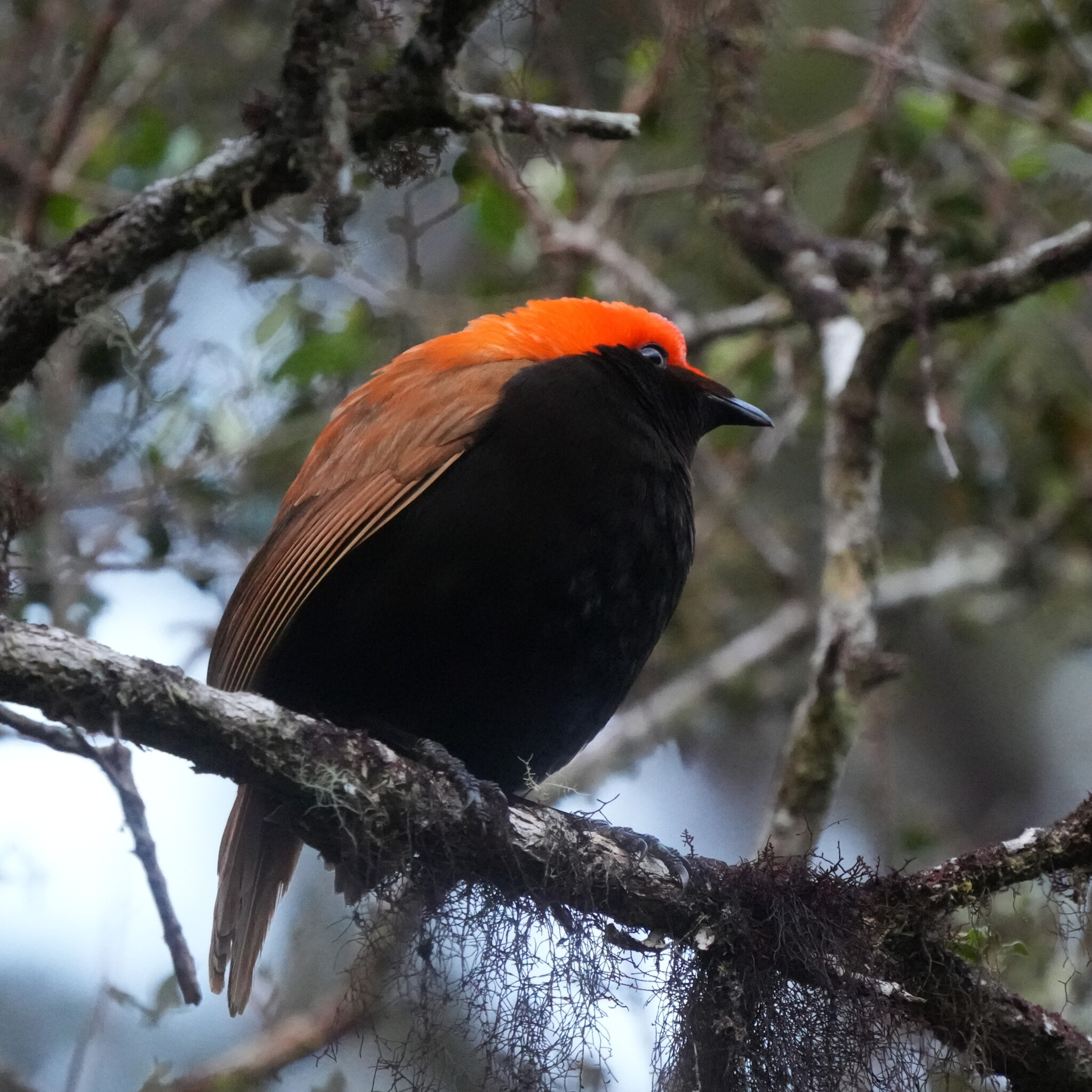
- Crested satinbird (Cnemophilus macgregorii)

Scientific classification
- Kingdom: Animalia
- Phylum: Chordata
- Class: Aves
- Order: Passeriformes
- Infraorder: Passerides
- Family: Cnemophilidae; Mayr, 1962

Genera
- Cnemophilus; Loboparadisea

= Satinbird =

Satinbirds

Family of birds

The satinbirds or cnemophilids, are passerine birds of the family Cnemophilidae, from Ancient Greek κνημός (knemós), meaning "mountain/slope", and φίλος (phílos), meaning "lover", which consists of four species found in the mountain forests of New Guinea. They were originally thought to be part of the birds-of-paradise family Paradisaeidae until genetic research suggested that the birds are not closely related to birds-of-paradise at all and are perhaps closer to berry peckers and longbills (Melanocharitidae). The current evidence suggests that their closest relatives may be the cuckoo-shrikes (Campephagidae).

== Etymology ==
The family name "Cnemophilidae", taken from the genus Cnemophilus, comes from Ancient Greek κνημός (knemós), meaning "mountain/slope", and φίλος (phílos), meaning "lover", referring to the species' fondness for mountain slopes.

== Description ==
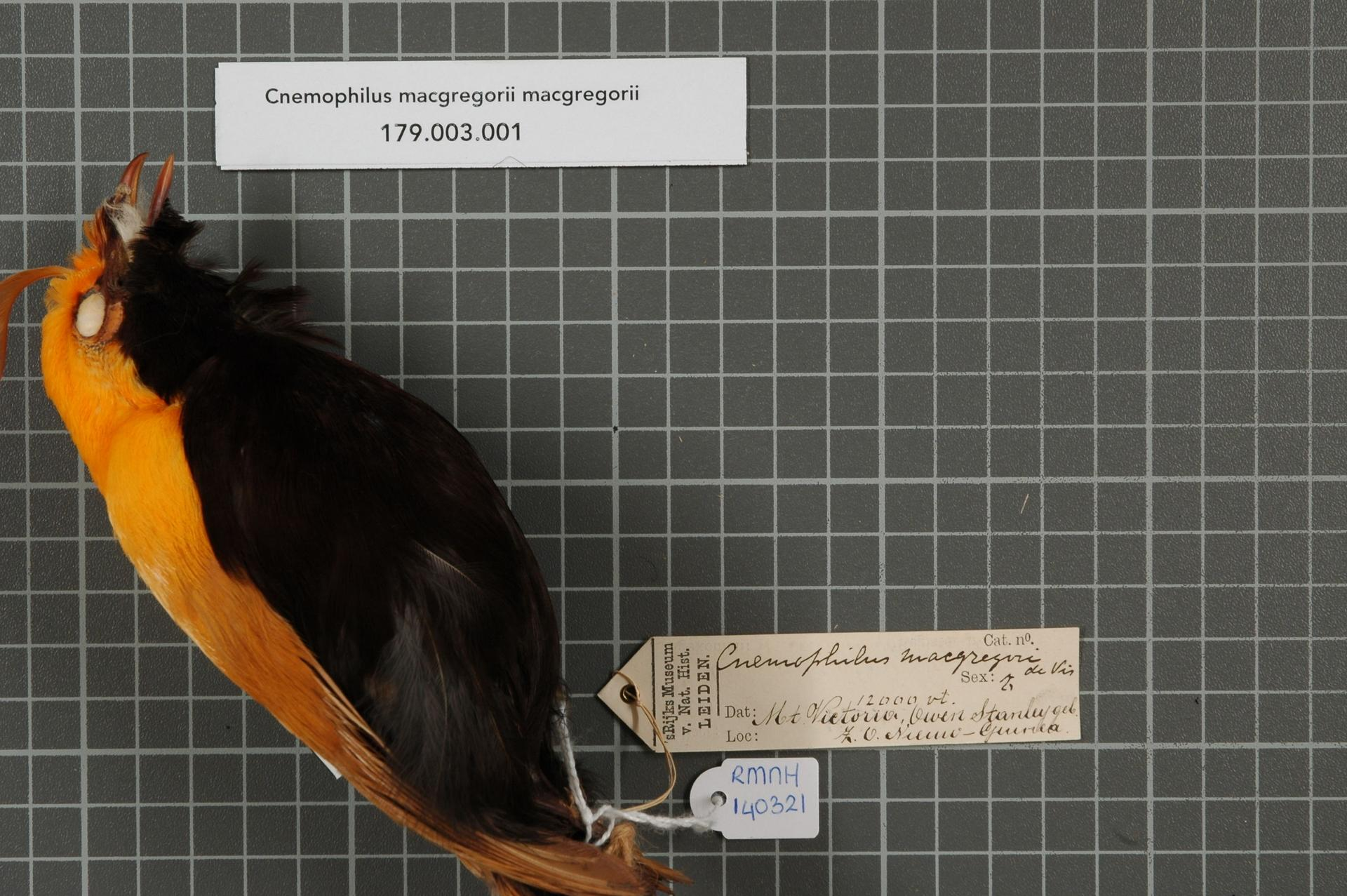
Male yellow satinbird

Male red satinbirds possess a large patch of color on a region known as upperparts. These upperparts can range from a reddish orange to a flame red, along with dark blackish to black feathers on the underside of the body. The males also display a sagittal crest that lies on the crown and extends from the forehead to nearly the back of the head. Female satinbirds are olive brown with paler undersides. Male yellow satinbirds have flame-yellow plumage on the upperparts, black coloration on the bottom of their heads and bodies, and golden crest plumages. while females are brownish to olive above with pale light-yellow undersides.

Male Loria's satinbird is mostly black with purple irridescence; the birds also possess iridescent light blue secondary wing feathers, iridescent blue tail feathers, and an iridescent greenish-aqua patch of feathers on the top of the head ending at the base of the beak. Females Loria's satianbirds, are olive greenish with lighter underparts, similar to female red satinbirds. Male yellow-breasted satinbirds have primarily reddish-olive upperparts, with the exception of the gold-yellow rump. The underside is golden from base of the beak and cheeks to the breast, then fades to a paler yellow wash. The males yellow-breasted satinbirds also have pale sky blue waddles on the top of the bill. The female yellow-breasted satinbird is brownish rufous above and cream below with brownish streaks from the chin to the breast.

Satinbirds have weak, non-manipulative feet, wide gapes, as well as an unossified nasal region. Their bodies are compact with rounded wings.

== Distribution and habitat ==
The range of the Loria's satinbird is most likely the largest in the central highlands, around 2000–4000 meters, but is inconspicuous except when resting at fruiting trees. The red satinbird inhabits high mountain forests and shrubbery. The yellow-breasted satinbird is the least known. Almost nothing is known of its biology, and it seems scarce and local within the patches of habitat along the central ranges east to the base of the Huon Peninsula. Although the range of the Yellow satinbirds is mostly unknown, it is thought that they are founds in the "Bird's Tail" region in Southeast New Guinea.

== Behavior and ecology ==
All species of satinbirds build domed nests, unlike those of birds of paradise.The female lays a single egg and nurtures it without any assistance from the male. Satinbirds feed exclusively on fruit throughout their lifetime.

== Species ==
Family: Cnemophilidae

Image	Genus	Living species
	Cnemophilus De Vis, 1890	Loria's satinbird, Cnemophilus loriae; Red satinbird, Cnemophilus sanguineus; Yellow satinbird, Cnemophilus macgregorii (split as a species in 2016 from C. sanguineus)
	Loboparadisea Rothschild, 1896	Yellow-breasted satinbird, Loboparadisea sericea
