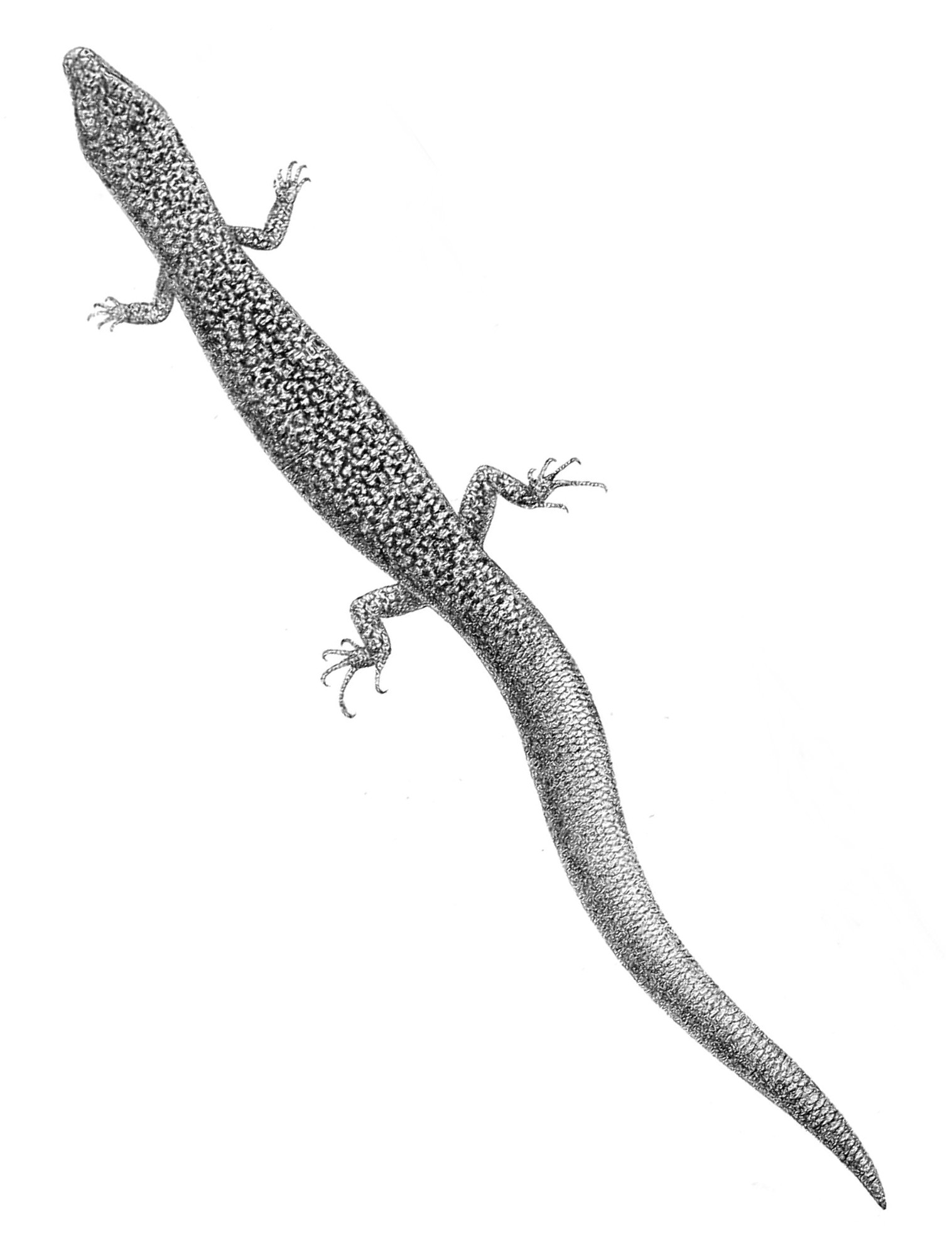
- Drawing of Sphenomorphus loriae

Conservation status
- Least Concern (IUCN 3.1)

Scientific classification
- Kingdom: Animalia
- Phylum: Chordata
- Class: Reptilia
- Order: Squamata
- Family: Scincidae
- Genus: Sphenomorphus
- Species: S. loriae

Binomial name
- Sphenomorphus loriae (Boulenger, 1897)

Synonyms
- Lygosoma loriae Boulenger, 1897

= Sphenomorphus loriae =

Species of lizard

Sphenomorphus loriae is a species of lizard in the subfamily Sphenomorphinae of the family Scincidae (skinks). The species is endemic to Papua New Guinea.

== Etymology ==
The specific name, loriae, is in honor of Italian ethnologist Lamberto Loria.

== Description ==
Dorsally, S.loriae is blackish brown, flecked and vermiculated with lighter yellowish brown. Ventrally, it is yellowish. The holotype has a snout-to-vent length (SVL) of 66 mm (2.6 in), and a regenerated tail 77 mm (3.0 in) long.

== Habitat ==
The preferred natural habitat of S. loriae is forest, at altitudes of 1,000–1,500 m (3,300–4,900 ft).
