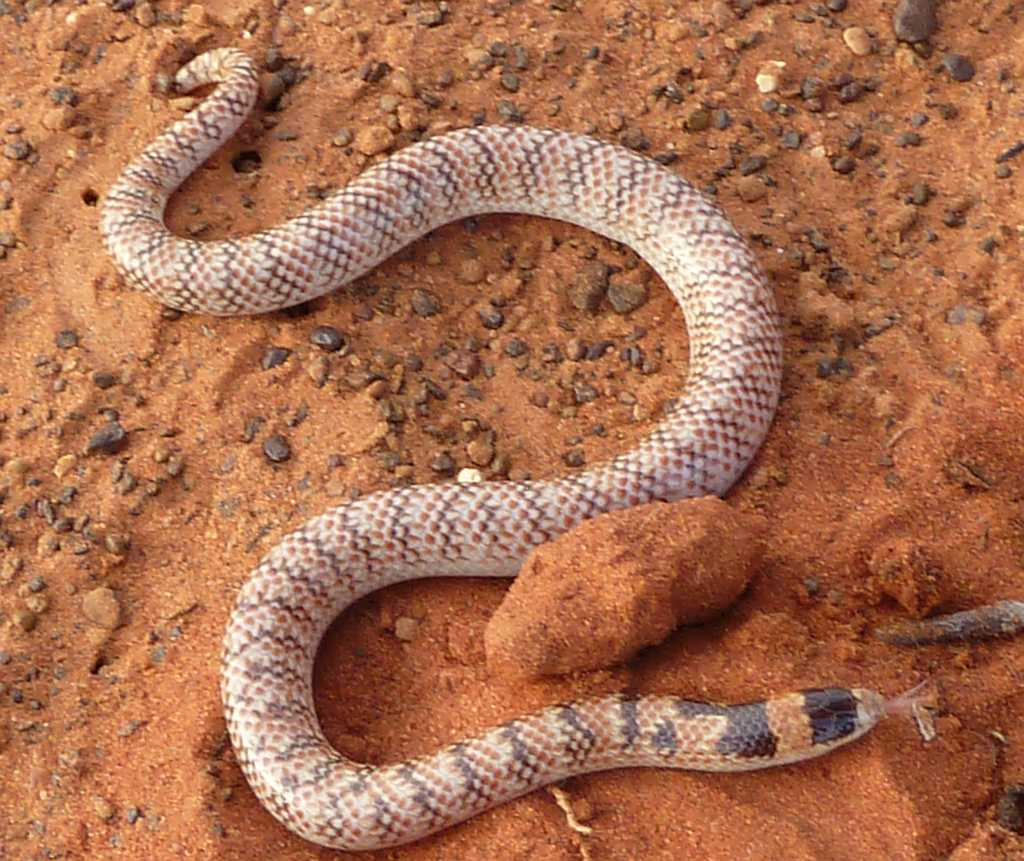
- Brachyurophis fasciolatus

Scientific classification
- Kingdom: Animalia
- Phylum: Chordata
- Class: Reptilia
- Order: Squamata
- Suborder: Serpentes
- Family: Elapidae
- Subfamily: Hydrophiinae
- Genus: Brachyurophis; Günther, 1863

= Brachyurophis =

Genus of snakes

Brachyurophis is a genus of elapid snakes known as shovel-nosed snakes, so named because of their shovel-nosed snout which is used to burrow. The genus has eight recognized species, which are all found in Australia.

== Species ==
- Brachyurophis approximans (Glauert, 1854) – North-western shovel-nosed snake
- Brachyurophis australis (Krefft, 1864) – (Australian) coral snake, Eastern shovel-nosed snake
- Brachyurophis campbelli (Kinghorn, 1929) – Cape York shovel-nosed snake
- Brachyurophis fasciolatus (Günther, 1872) – Narrow-banded shovel-nosed snake
- Brachyurophis incinctus (Storr, 1968) – Unbanded shovel-nosed snake
- Brachyurophis morrisi (Horner, 1998) – Arnhem shovel-nosed snake
- Brachyurophis roperi (Kinghorn, 1931) – Northern shovel-nosed snake
- Brachyurophis semifasciatus Günther, 1863 – Southern shovel-nosed snake

The above species are sometimes included in the genus Simoselaps, sensu lato.

Nota bene: A binomial authority in parentheses indicates that the species was originally described in a genus other than Brachyurophis.

== Geographic distribution ==
- B. approximans - Western Australia North West Coastal and Western Plateau.
- B. australis - New South Wales, Queensland, South Australia and Victoria.
- B. fasciolatus - New South Wales, Queensland, Western Australia, South Australia and Northern Territory.
- B. incinctus - Northern Territory and Queensland.
- B. morrisi - Northern Territory North Coast.
- B. roperi - Northern Territory and Western Australia North Coast.
- B. semifasciata - Western Australia, South Australia, Queensland and Northern Territory.
