= Brachyurophis roperi =

Conservation status
- Least Concern (IUCN 3.1)

Scientific classification
- Kingdom: Animalia
- Phylum: Chordata
- Class: Reptilia
- Order: Squamata
- Suborder: Serpentes
- Family: Elapidae
- Genus: Brachyurophis
- Species: B. roperi

Binomial name
- Brachyurophis roperi (Kinghorn, 1931)

Synonyms
- Rhynchoelaps roperi Kinghorn, 1931; Vermicella semifasciata roperi Storr, 1968; Simoselaps roperi Wallach, 1985; Simoselaps semifasciatus roperi Cogger, 1986

Species of Australian snake

Brachyurophis roperi, also known as the northern shovel-nosed snake, is a species of mildly venomous burrowing snake that is endemic to Australia. The specific epithet roperi refers to the type locality of the Roper River Mission in the Northern Territory. It was formerly considered a subspecies of Brachyurophis semifasciatus.

== Description ==
The species grows to an average of about 37 centimetres or 15 inches in length. There are dark brown to black bands along the length of the orange to reddish-brown upper body. The belly is whitish.

== Behaviour ==
The species is oviparous with a clutch size of three. It feeds on reptile eggs.

== Distribution and habitat ==
The species' range extends from Broome in Western Australia, eastwards through the Kimberley region, the Top End of the Northern Territory as far south as Ti-Tree, to Camooweal in western Queensland. It occurs in sandy soils as well as in heavy soils and rocky ranges.
