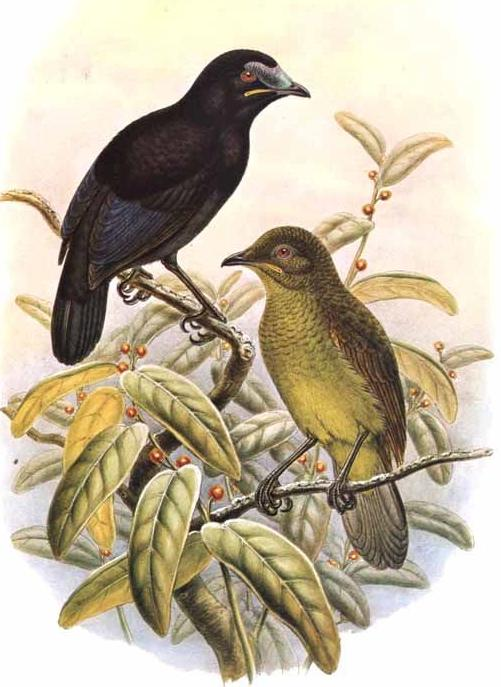

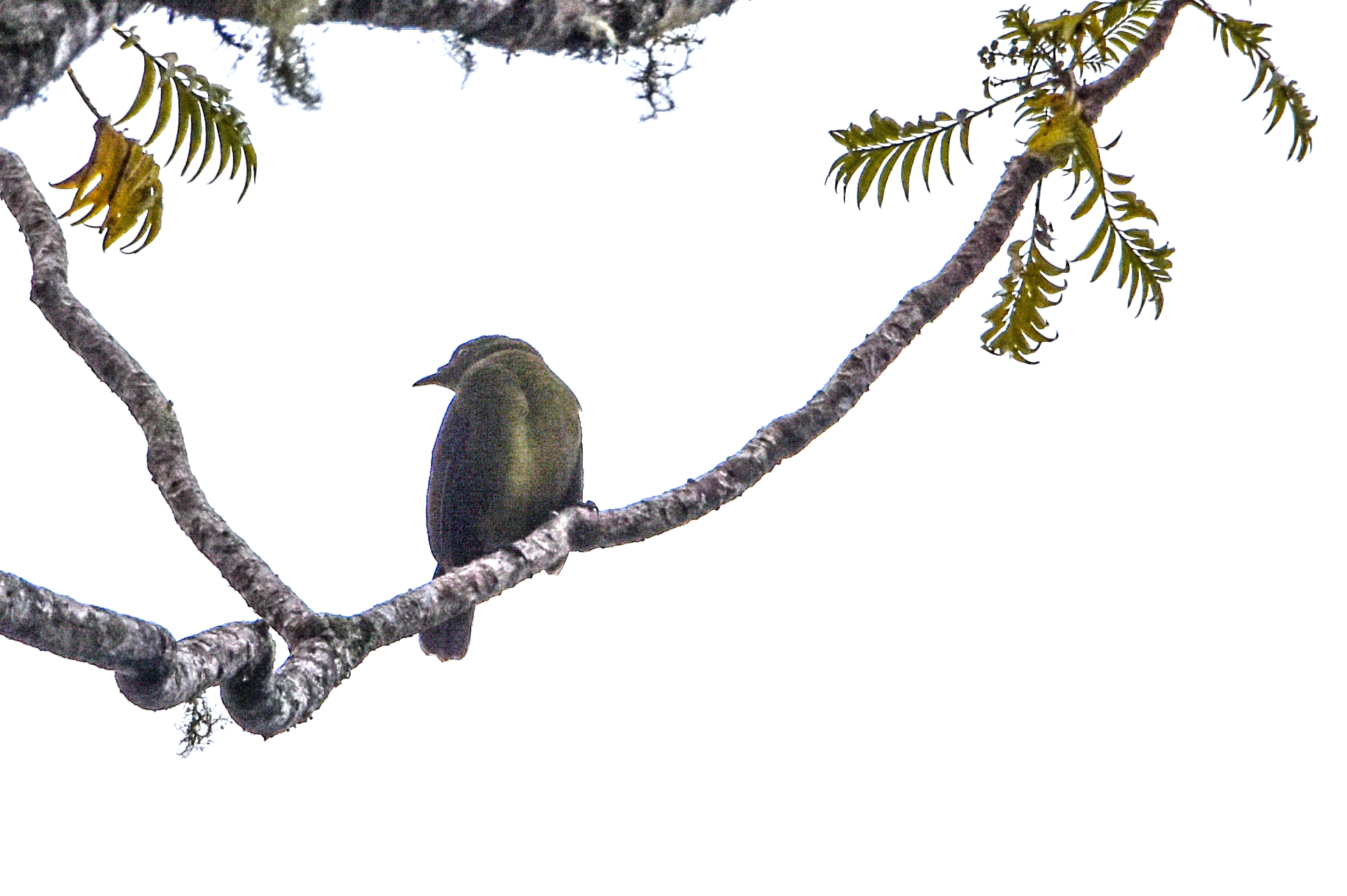

Conservation status
- Least Concern (IUCN 3.1)

Scientific classification
- Kingdom: Animalia
- Phylum: Chordata
- Class: Aves
- Order: Passeriformes
- Family: Cnemophilidae
- Genus: Cnemophilus
- Species: C. loriae

Binomial name
- Cnemophilus loriae (Salvadori, 1895)

= Loria's satinbird =

Species of bird

Loria's satinbird or velvet satinbird (Cnemophilus loriae), formerly known as Loria's bird-of-paradise, is a species of bird in the family Cnemophilidae. It is found in the New Guinea Highlands. Its natural habitats are subtropical or tropical moist lowland forests and subtropical or tropical moist montane forests.

== Taxonomy ==
Cnemophilus loriae was first described by the Italian ornithologist Tommaso Salvadori in 1895 from specimens collected in the Owen Stanley Range of southeastern New Guinea. The species is a member of the satinbird family Cnemophilidae, a small lineage of montane New Guinean passerines formerly classified among the birds-of-paradise. Molecular and morphological evidence later demonstrated that satinbirds are not closely related to the true birds-of-paradise and instead represent a distinct corvoid lineage now recognized as the family Cnemophilidae.

The specific epithet loriae honors the wife of explorer Lamberto Loria, who collected the first known specimens. The species has also historically been associated with the name Cnemophilus mariae, described by Charles Walter De Vis in 1894 as “Lady Macgregor's Bowerbird”, though this taxon was later synonymized with C. loriae.

Three subspecies are typically recognized: C. l. loriae, C. l. amethystinus and C. l. inexspectata. However, some more recent authors have treated the species as monotypic due to extensive variation and overlap between populations.

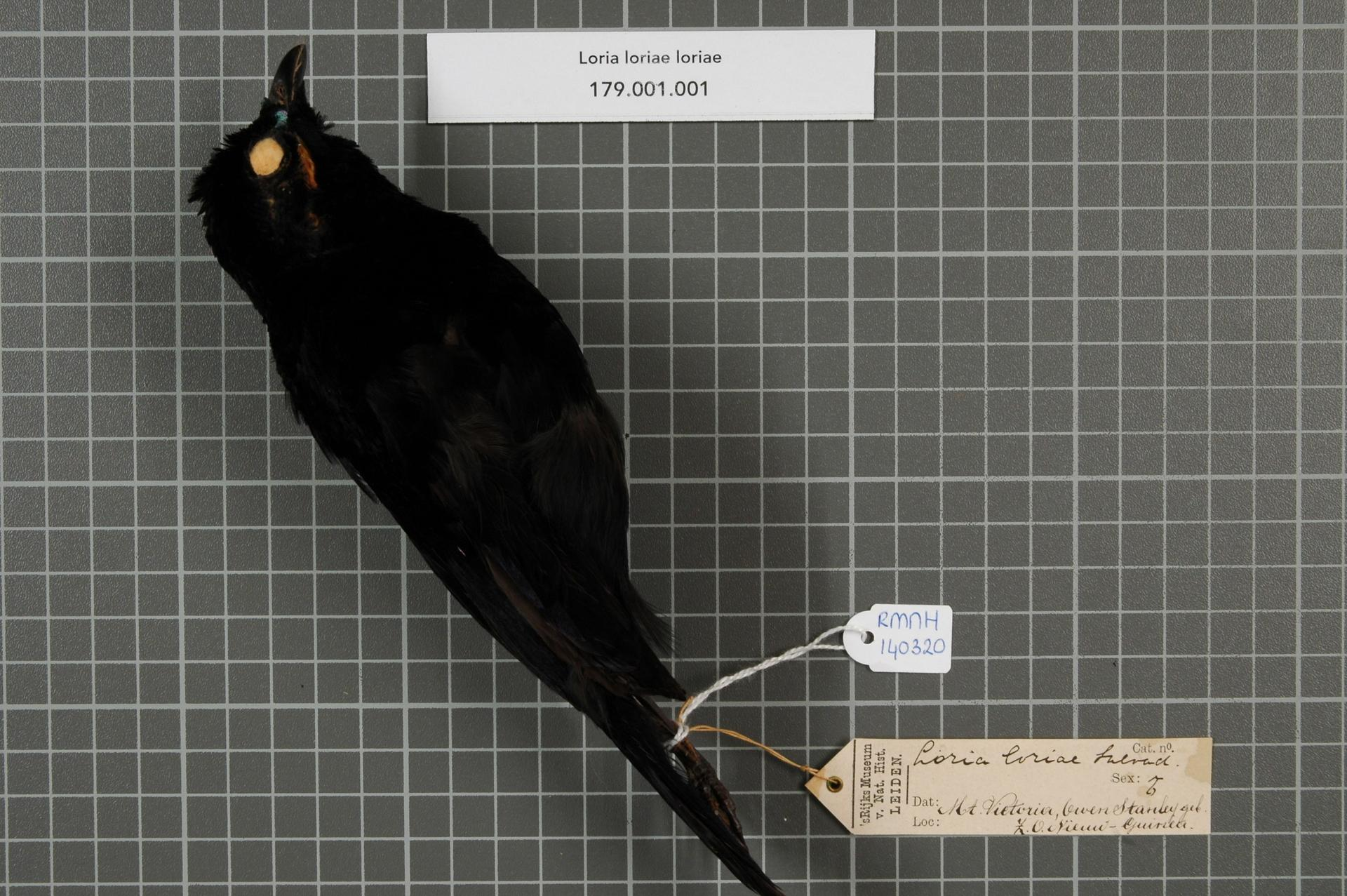
Nominate race C. l. loriae male

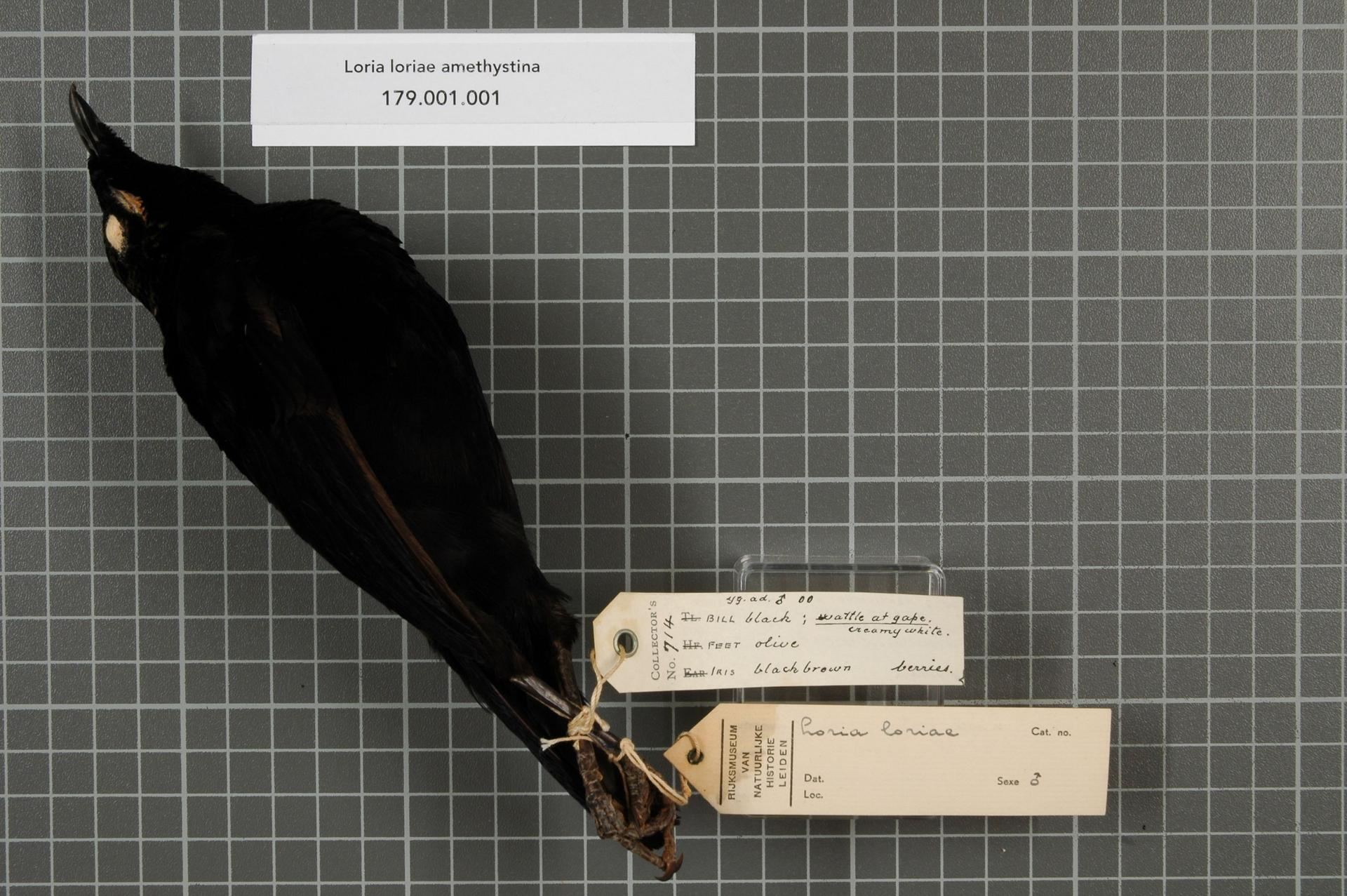
C. l. amethystina male

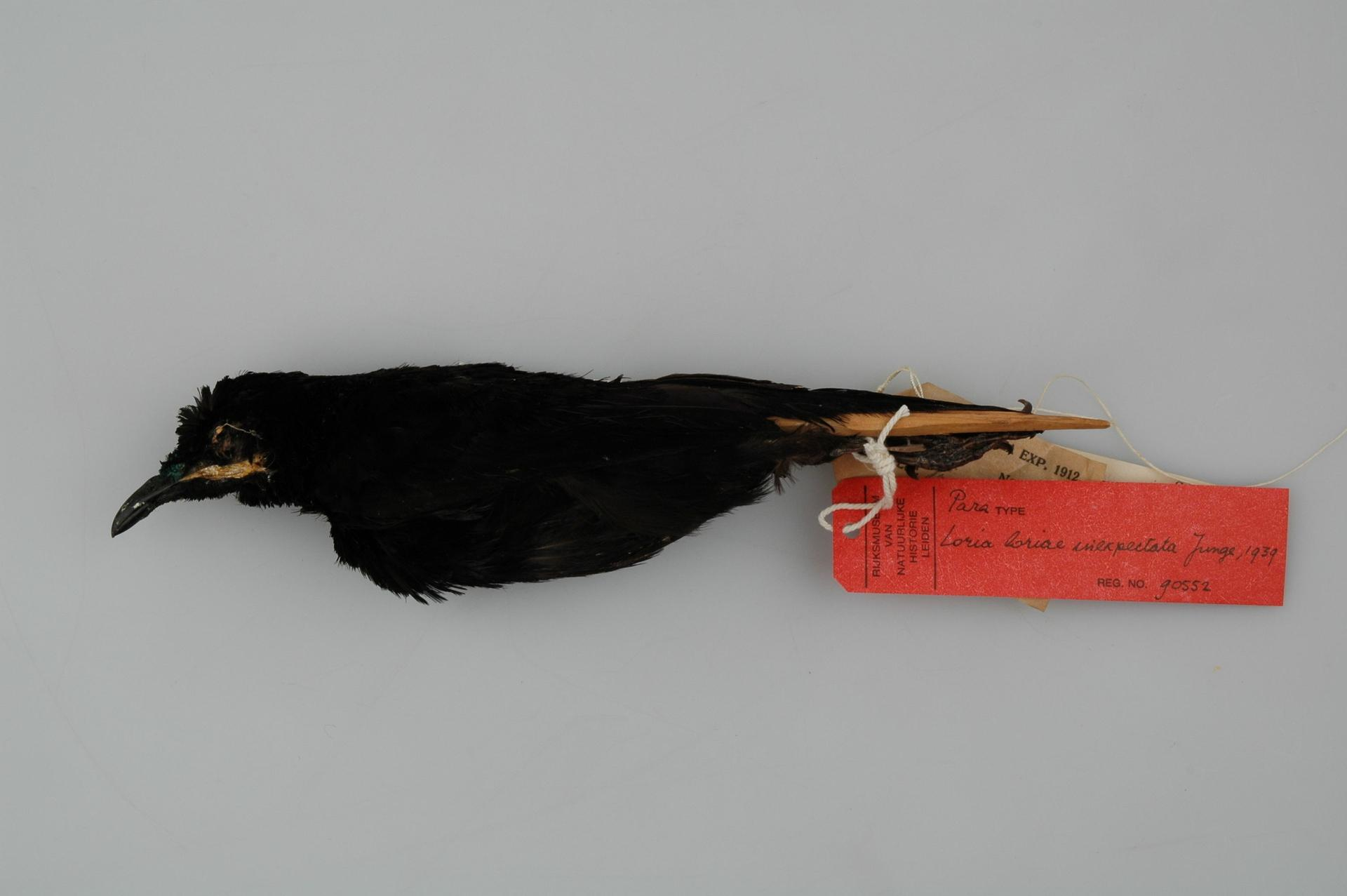
C. l. inexpectata male

== Distribution and habitat ==
Loria’s satinbird is endemic to the montane forests of New Guinea, ranging from the Weyland Mountains of western New Guinea eastward through the central cordillera to the Owen Stanley Range of Papua New Guinea. The species is absent from the Vogelkop Peninsula and Huon Peninsula..

It inhabits montane forest, forest edge, and secondary growth between about 4,920 and 9,840 ft elevation, though it is most commonly encountered between approximately 6,560 and 7,870 ft.

The species forages throughout multiple forest strata but appears to spend much of its time in the lower and middle levels of the forest. Individuals are frequently observed hopping along large moss-covered branches and are often associated with fruiting trees.

== Description ==
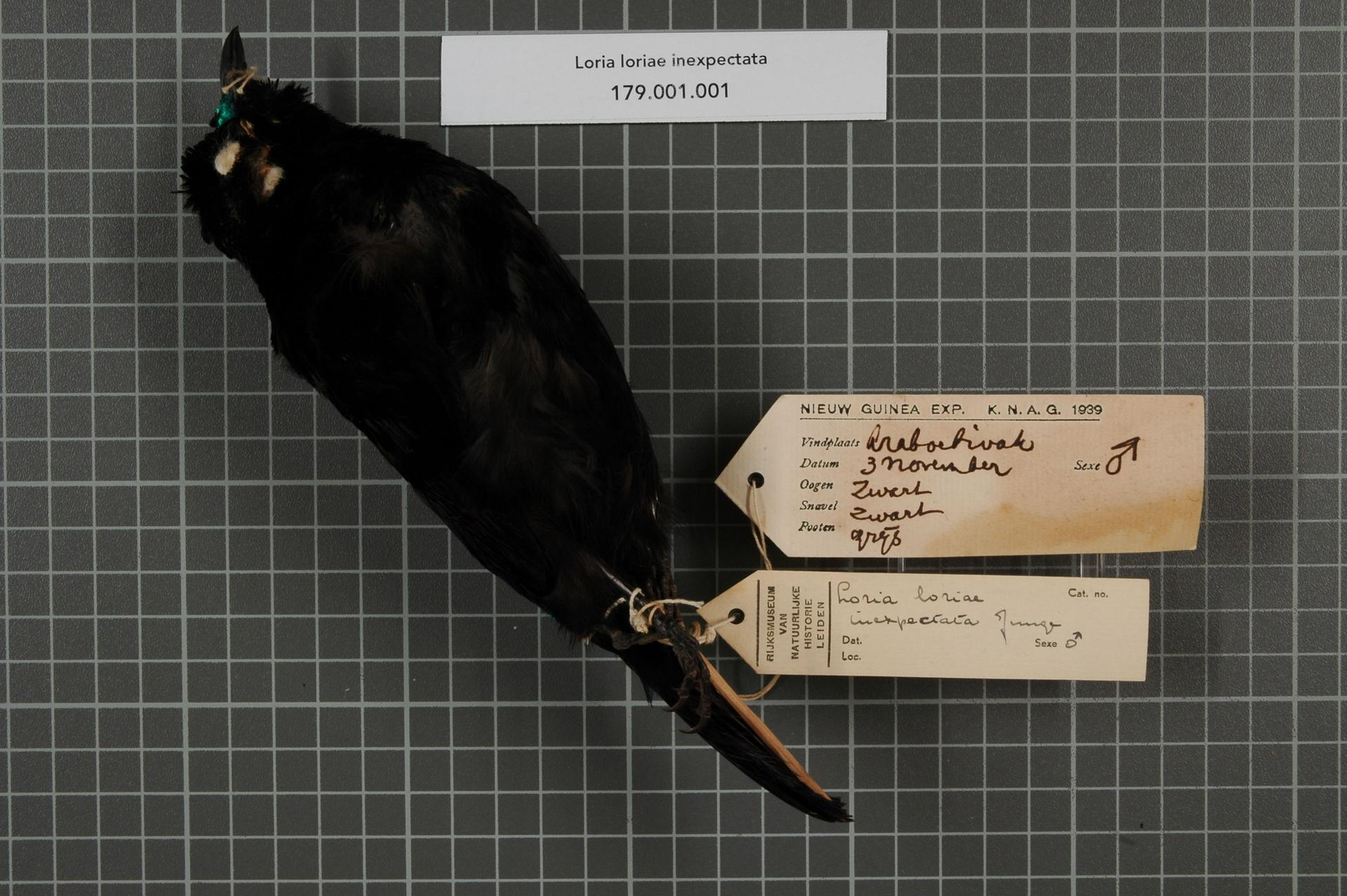
Male C. loriae displaying the superblack plumage and iridescent blue head feathers.

This bird is a compact, short-tailed species with rounded wings and pronounced sexual dimorphism. Adult males measure about 8.7 in in length and weigh approximately 2.6–3.6 oz. The plumage is velvety black with iridescent purple, magenta, and metallic green-blue glossing, especially on the head, tertials, and upperparts. The bill is glossy black with a sharply keeled culmen, and the mouth lining and gape flanges are pale yellowish to lime-green, features prominently displayed during calling behavior.

Females are smaller and much duller, with predominantly olive-green plumage, browner wings and tail, and yellower underparts. Juveniles briefly pass through a grey plumage stage before acquiring female-like coloration, while immature males gradually develop darker plumage and iridescent feathering with age.

=== Super black feather microstructures ===
The male’s unusually dark plumage is structurally enhanced by specialized feather microstructures that reduce reflectance and create a “super black” appearance. A 2019 study identified C. loriae as one of at least 15 avian families to independently evolve super black plumage through convergent evolution. The species possesses densely packed, upward-curving barbules that trap and repeatedly scatter light, minimizing reflectance and intensifying the appearance of adjacent iridescent colors. These feather structures place Loria’s satinbird within the “curved array” category of super black plumage morphology alongside birds-of-paradise and certain starlings.

== Behavior ==
=== General habits ===
It is generally inconspicuous and often overlooked except when males are calling or when individuals gather at fruiting trees.

=== Diet ===
The species is primarily frugivorous, feeding on berries and drupes swallowed whole from the middle and lower forest strata. Recorded food plants include species of Pittosporum, Acronychia, Timonius, Drimys, Symplocos, Riedelia, Xanthomyrtus, Elaeocarpus, and Psychotria. Individuals may feed alongside birds-of-paradise, berrypeckers, fruit-doves, and other montane frugivores at productive fruiting trees.

=== Reproduction ===
Males produce a repetitive advertising call described as a rising “zheee”, “weep”, or “kerrng” note delivered from elevated perches for long periods. During display, males frequently hold the beak open to expose the pale interior of the mouth, enhancing the contrast against the super black plumage.

Loria’s satinbird appears to have a polygynous mating system in which males advertise from traditional song perches while females alone attend the nest. Courtship behavior remains incompletely known. Displaying males have been observed hanging upside down beneath branches while quivering the wings and producing clicking sounds, possibly with the bill. Males may also yawn or hold the bill widely open to expose the pale mouth lining during display, creating contrast against its superblack plumage.

The nest is a substantial globular domed structure composed primarily of mosses, filmy ferns, orchid stems, and sticks. Nests are usually placed low above the ground on steep moss-covered rock faces or tree trunks within wet montane forest ravines, where they are heavily camouflaged against surrounding vegetation. Several nests have been found clustered within the same areas, suggesting females may reuse traditional nesting sites across multiple breeding seasons.

The clutch appears to consist of a single egg. Eggs are pale pinkish buff with russet, tan-brown, and purple-grey spotting concentrated toward the broader end. One documented egg measured approximately 1.45 × 0.96 in and weighed about 0.40 oz. Incubation lasts approximately 25–26 days, a relatively long period for birds-of-paradise that may be associated with the cool high-elevation climate inhabited by the species. Hatchlings are naked and predominantly dark-skinned with pale gapes and conspicuously white claws. Available evidence strongly suggests that females alone perform incubation and nestling care, with no confirmed male participation at the nest.

== Threats ==
Loria’s satinbird is generally regarded as fairly common and widespread throughout much of its montane range, though it is often overlooked due to its quiet habits and inconspicuous behavior. Historically, some reports suggested localized declines due to hunting for the plume trade, though later authors considered this unlikely and noted no confirmed records of the species being widely used as ornamentation.

The species currently faces no major known large-scale threats beyond localized habitat clearance associated with logging and agriculture. Much of its range remains within relatively intact montane forest, and the species is generally considered reasonably secure.
