= Brachyurophis campbelli =

Conservation status
- Least Concern (IUCN 3.1)

Scientific classification
- Kingdom: Animalia
- Phylum: Chordata
- Class: Reptilia
- Order: Squamata
- Suborder: Serpentes
- Family: Elapidae
- Genus: Brachyurophis
- Species: B. campbelli

Binomial name
- Brachyurophis campbelli (Kinghorn, 1929)

Synonyms
- Rhynchoelaps campbelli Kinghorn 1929; Rhynchelaps wood-jonesii Thomson 1934; Brachyurophis campbelli Minton et al. 1970; Simoselaps semifasciatus campbelli Cogger 1986; Simoselaps semifasciatus woodjonesi Wilson & Knowles 1988; Simoselaps semifasciatus campbelli Golay 1993

Species of Australian snake

Brachyurophis campbelli, also known as the Cape York shovel-nosed snake or Einasliegh shovel-nosed snake, is a species of mildly venomous burrowing snake that is endemic to Australia. The specific epithet campbelli honours a Mr W.D. Campbell who collected the type specimen in 1928 in the vicinity of Almaden, Queensland.

== Description ==
The species grows to an average of about 40 cm in length. There are dark brown to black bands along the length of the orange to reddish-brown body, the dark bands similar in width to the spaces separating them. The belly is whitish.

== Behaviour ==
The species is oviparous. It is presumed to feed on reptile eggs.

== Distribution and habitat ==
The species occurs in northern Queensland, including the Cape York Peninsula, its range extending as far south as Longreach, in woodland habitats.
