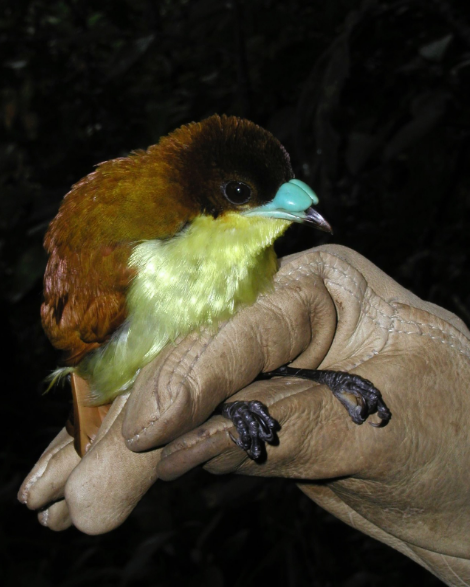

Conservation status
- Least Concern (IUCN 3.1)

Scientific classification
- Kingdom: Animalia
- Phylum: Chordata
- Class: Aves
- Order: Passeriformes
- Family: Cnemophilidae
- Genus: Loboparadisea; Rothschild, 1896
- Species: L. sericea

Binomial name
- Loboparadisea sericea Rothschild, 1896

= Yellow-breasted satinbird =

Species of bird

The yellow-breasted satinbird (Loboparadisea sericea), formerly known as the yellow-breasted bird-of-paradise and also known as the silken satinbird, is a species of bird in the family Cnemophilidae. It is monotypic within the genus Loboparadisea. It is found in the New Guinea highlands. Its natural habitats are subtropical or tropical moist lowland forest and subtropical or tropical moist montane forest. It is threatened by habitat loss.

== Taxonomy ==
Loboparadisaea sericea was first described by Walter Rothschild in 1896 and is the sole member of the genus Loboparadisaea. The genus name derives from the Greek lobos, meaning “lobe”, in reference to the enlarged nasal wattles of adult males, combined with paradisaea, meaning bird-of-paradise.

The species was historically classified among the birds-of-paradise and placed within the cnemophiline assemblage alongside the satinbirds of the genus Cnemophilus. However, more recent molecular studies have suggested that satinbirds are not especially closely related to the true birds-of-paradise and instead represent a distinct lineage now commonly placed within the family Cnemophilidae.

Satinbirds differ from birds-of-paradise in several morphological characteristics, including their broad gapes, relatively short bills, and unusual unossified region surrounding the nostrils. Although some authors proposed synonymising Loboparadisaea with Cnemophilus, later works retained it as a distinct monotypic genus owing to its unique morphology, plumage characteristics, and enlarged bifurcate nasal wattles.

Two subspecies are generally recognised:

- L. s. sericea Rothschild, 1896 – western and central New Guinea.
- L. s. aurora Mayr, 1930 – eastern populations from the Herzog Range and nearby regions.

Considerable geographic variation has been reported throughout its range, and some authors have suggested that additional undescribed forms may exist in western New Guinea.

== Distribution and habitat ==
The yellow-breasted satinbird is endemic to the central mountain ranges of New Guinea, where it occurs patchily from the Weyland Mountains eastward through the central cordillera to the Herzog Range and Wau Valley regions of Papua New Guinea.

It inhabits lower montane and mid-montane forest, usually between 625 and 2,000 m elevation, though most records are from above 1,200 m. The species appears to prefer the interior of mature forest rather than forest edges, differing from related satinbirds that are more commonly associated with edge habitats.

Although traditionally regarded as rare and poorly known, field surveys have found it locally common in some areas, particularly in montane primary forest. Individuals have been observed in the lower canopy, midstorey, subcanopy, and occasionally near the forest floor, though the species is generally considered quiet, secretive, and easy to overlook.

== Description ==
The yellow-breasted satinbird is a compact, short-tailed bird measuring about 17 cm (6.7 in) in length. Adult males typically weigh 50–75 g, while females are slightly larger and heavier. Adult males are distinctive in having silky sulfur-yellow underparts, including the breast, belly, rump, and malar region, contrasting strongly with the darker honey-brown upperparts. The crown and face are dark brown with an iridescent coppery sheen, while the wings and tail are brown with darker flight feathers. Males possess enlarged bifurcate nasal wattles above the bill, which may appear turquoise-green, pale lime-green, yellowish, or blackish depending on age and geography. The males of the subspecies aurora slightly larger, have a longer tail and more pale head feathers, upperparts and light blue wattles.

Females lack the enlarged wattles and are duller overall, with brown upperparts and buffier or cinnamon-toned underparts marked by darker streaking. Juveniles resemble females but are duller and more heavily streaked, while young males gradually develop the swollen nasal wattles before acquiring the bright adult coloration.

=== Vocalizations ===
The species is among the least vocally known birds-of-paradise. Its best-known call has been described as a series of loud, harsh, grating notes, often rendered as “sssh ssh ssh”, usually given in short bursts separated by pauses. The notes reportedly become slower, stronger, and lower-pitched as the sequence progresses. Additional vocalizations recorded in the field include quiet churring sounds, snapping noises, harsh growls, and emphatic “grwhaa” calls. Both sexes have been reported to respond to conspecific vocalizations.

== Behavior ==
=== General habits ===
The yellow-breasted satinbird is generally quiet, sluggish, and inconspicuous. Individuals often move slowly through mossy branches in the canopy or subcanopy and may remain motionless for long periods between short flights. Although usually solitary, small loose groups have occasionally been observed at fruiting trees.

=== Diet ===
The species is believed to be primarily frugivorous, feeding largely on fruits, drupes, and berries swallowed whole. Field observations have documented individuals feeding on figs (Ficus) and other soft fruits in the canopy. Stomach contents from examined specimens contained mostly fruit material and seeds, with arthropods recorded only rarely, suggesting that insects make up a minor component of the diet. An adult male observed during fieldwork was seen feeding on fruits from a vine in the lower canopy, and captured individuals sometimes regurgitated seeds during handling.

=== Reproduction ===
Very little is known about the reproductive biology of the yellow-breasted satinbird. The mating system has long been presumed to be polygynous, though some ornithologists have speculated that the species may instead be monogamous due to the relatively limited sexual dimorphism.

Courtship displays remain undescribed. The enlarged nasal wattles of adult males are believed to function as sexually selected display structures.

Nesting behavior is similarly poorly documented. Local accounts from the Weyland Mountains describe the nest as an open moss structure placed in vegetation relatively close to the ground, containing a single egg. Incubation and parental care remain unknown.

== Threats ==
Although the yellow-breasted satinbird is locally threatened in some areas, such as around the Ok Tedi mining region, much of its range remains relatively intact and free from extensive large-scale habitat degradation. Remote sensing analyses have indicated that forest loss across the species' mapped range remained minimal during the three generations prior to 2021, with less than 1% forest loss recorded.

Current threats primarily include small-scale logging and mining activities, both of which may contribute to localized ecosystem degradation and habitat conversion within parts of its range.
