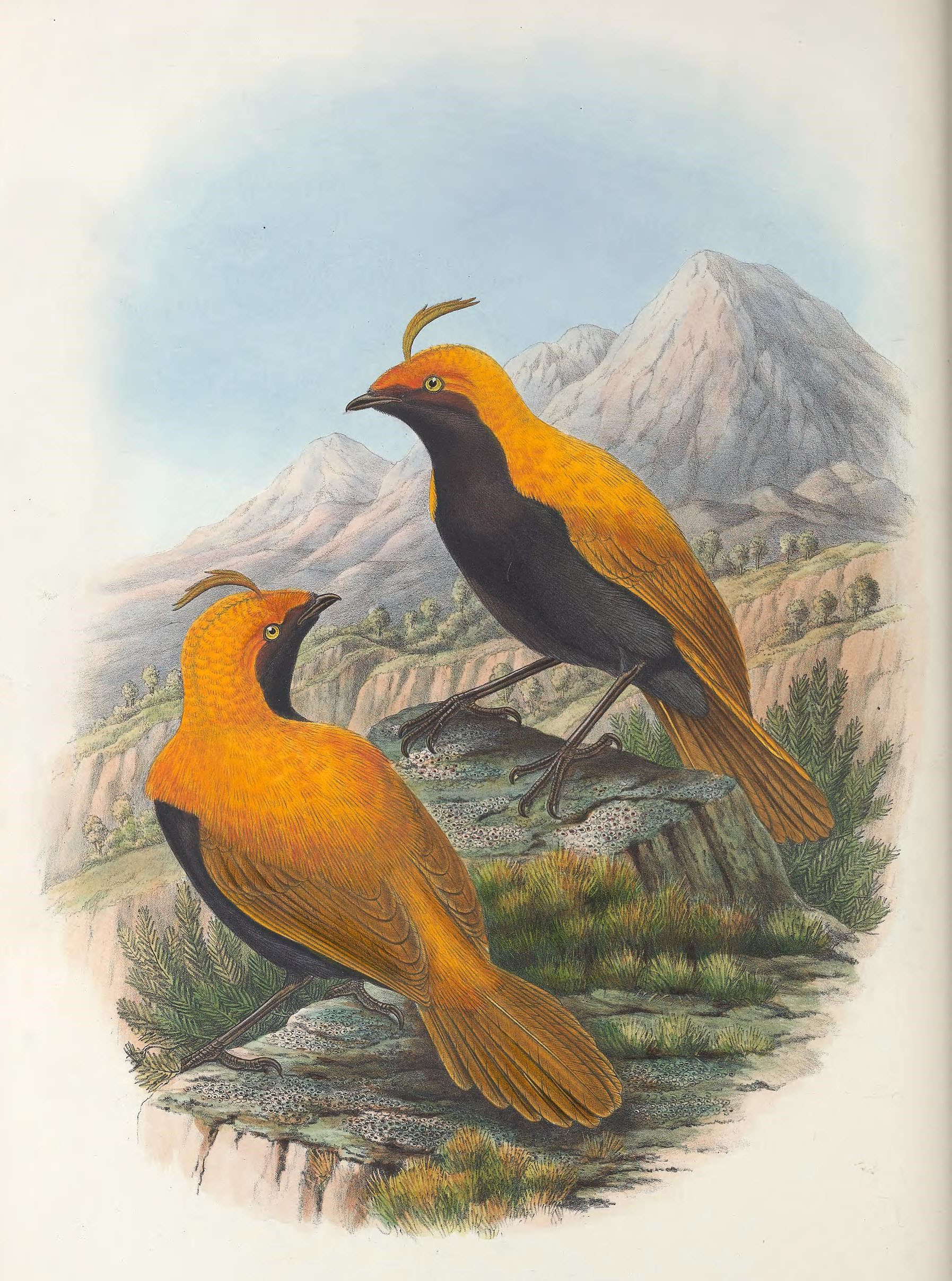
- Lithograph by William Hart showing two males of the nominate subspecies
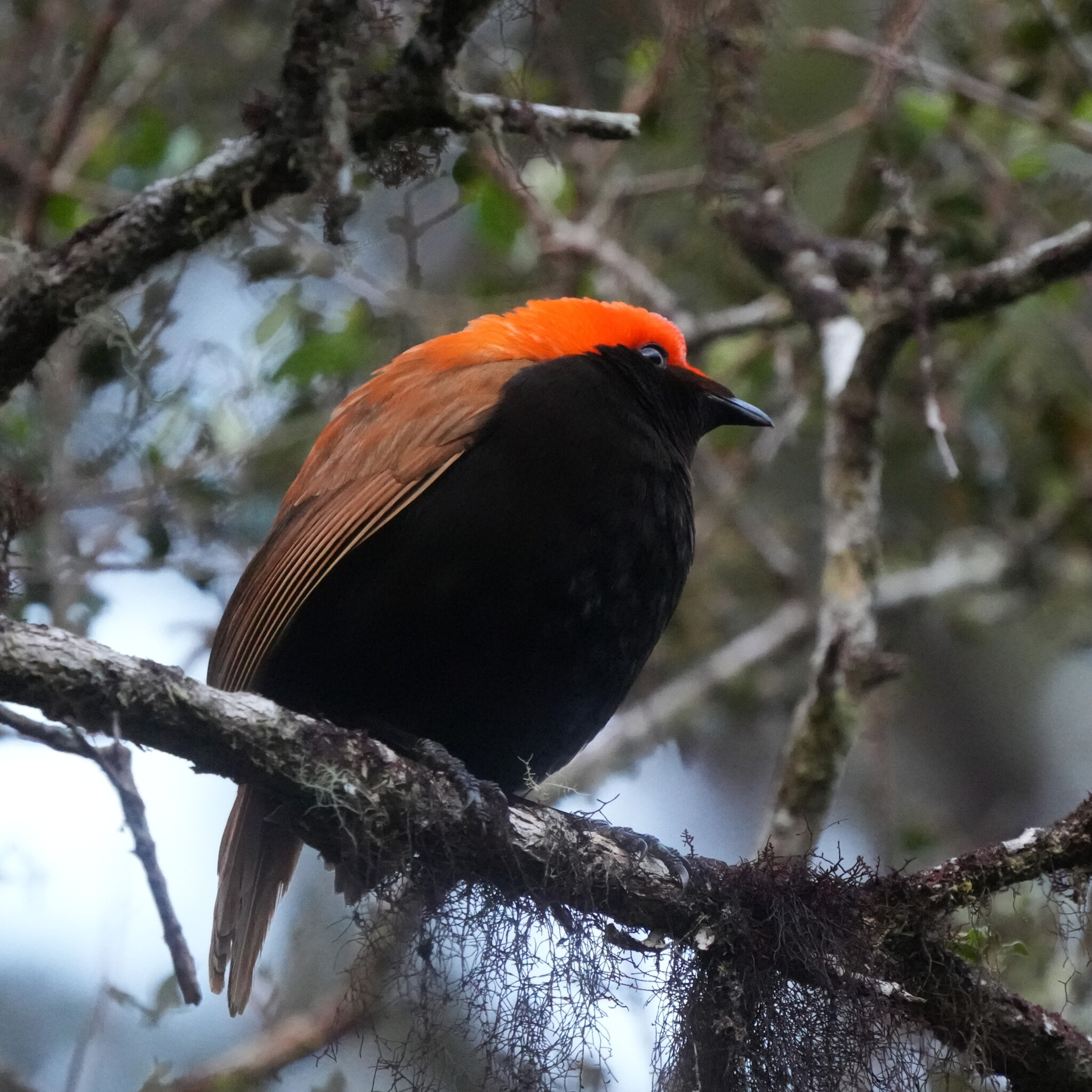

Conservation status
- Least Concern (IUCN 3.1)

Scientific classification
- Kingdom: Animalia
- Phylum: Chordata
- Class: Aves
- Order: Passeriformes
- Family: Cnemophilidae
- Genus: Cnemophilus
- Species: C. macgregorii

Binomial name
- Cnemophilus macgregorii De Vis, 1890

= Crested satinbird =

Species of bird

The crested satinbird (Cnemophilus macgregorii), formerly known as the crested bird-of-paradise, is a species of bird in the satinbird family Cnemophilidae. It is found in the mountains of Papua New Guinea.

== Taxonomy ==
The crested satinbird was formally described in 1890 by the English zoologist Charles Walter De Vis from a specimen that had been collected on Mount Knutsford near Mount Victoria in Papua New Guinea. He coined the binomial name Cnemophilus macgregorii. The specific epithet was chosen to honour the British colonial governor of New Guinea, William MacGregor.

The crested satinbird was formerly placed in the bird-of-paradise family Paradisaeidae with the English name "crested bird-of-paradise".

Two subspecies are recognised:

- Cnemophilus macgregorii sanguineus Iredale, 1948 – the "red satinbird" found in montane central west, central east New Guinea; sometimes treated as a full species.
- Cnemophilus macgregorii macgregorii De Vis, 1890 – the "yellow satinbird" found in montane south-eastern New Guinea.

== Description ==
The crested satinbird is around 24 cm (9.4 in) in overall length and weighs 79–125 g (2.8–4.4 oz). The male of the nominate subspecies has bright yellow upperparts with a small erectile crest of 4 to 6 sickle-shaped dark-buff feathers that are usually concealed. The lores and underparts are a brownish black. The female is plain olive brownish above and light brownish below. The adult male of subspecies sanguineus differs from the nominate in having red dorsal plumage. These birds make harsh rasping calls and a low hissing.

== Distribution and habitat ==
They are found in the mountains of eastern and southeastern New Guinea. The habitat is upper montane and subalpine forest where there is dense vegetation.

== Behaviour and ecology ==
=== Food and feeding ===
The crested satinbird eats only fruits which are plucked and eaten whole without any manipulation using the feet.

=== Breeding ===
The breeding season is from August to January. The nest is built by the female and is placed 2–4 m (6 ft 7 in – 13 ft 1 in) above the ground on a branch of a tree. The nest has a globular shape with an entrance hole at the side. The clutch is probably only a single egg which hatches after an incubation period of at least 19 days.
