= Lamberto Loria =

Italian ethnographer, naturalist and explorer

- Born: 12 February 1855; Alexandria
- Died: 4 April 1913 (aged 58); Rome
- Scientific career
- Fields: ethnographer, naturalist and explorer

Lamberto Loria (12 February 1855 – 4 April 1913) was an Italian ethnographer, naturalist and explorer.

== Biography ==
Born in Alexandria from a Jewish family, after the death of his mother Clara, he returned with his father Marco in Italy, in Pisa. Here he graduated in 1881 in mathematics. Then he approached the Italian Society of Anthropology and Ethnology founded in Florence by Paolo Mantegazza (1870), becoming interested to the ethno-anthropological studies.

In 1883 he visited Sweden, Norway, Finland and Russia, reaching to the Turkestan, places where he collected numerous items of ethnographic interest. In 1886, he left for New Guinea together with Elio Modigliani, but for health reasons he just stood briefly in India. Then he visited the upper Egypt going up the Nile to the First Cataract.

Soon he turned his scientific and ethnographic interests towards New Guinea, already partially explored between 1865 and 1886 by Luigi Maria d'Albertis and Odoardo Beccari. He left for the Southeast of New Guinea and at the end of 1888 for Papua, region that he explored in the years 1889-1890 and in 1892-1897.

In New Guinea he lived for a total of seven years and visited the Trobriand Islands. In 1905 he made one last short trip to Eritrea.

His very rich natural and ethnographic collections were donated to the largest Italian museums (Museo Civico di Storia Naturale di Genova, Pigorini National Museum of Prehistory and Ethnography, Museo di storia naturale sezione di antropologia ed etnologia of Florence and Museo Archeologico Etnologico of Modena). Nevertheless, he published very little works about his researches in New Guinea, which remained unpublished in the form of notes and diaries.

In his honor were named various species of animals, for example a species of frog (Oreophryne loriae), Boulenger's bow-fingered gecko (Cyrtodactylus loriae), a skink (Sphenomorphus loriae), the common worm-eating snake (Toxicocalamus loriae), Loria's satinbird (Cnemophilus loriae), the large tree mouse (Pogonomys loriae), two subspecies of birds (Ptilorrhoa leucosticta loriae, Pitta erythrogaster loriae), and others.

== Works ==
- Lettera al prof. P. Mantegazza, in Arch. per l'antropologia e l'etnologia, XIV (1884), pp. 414–418;
- Dall'interno della Nuova Guinea. Lettera del dott. Lamberto Loria., in Boll. della Soc. geografica italiana, s. 3, IV (1891), pp. 905–911;
- I viaggi del dott. Lamberto Loria alla Nuova Guinea, ibid., X (1897), pp. 156–161;
- Atti del Congresso coloniale italiano in Asmara, ( 1905, a cura di C. Rossetti, Roma 1906, II, pp. 34, 52, 98, 104, 124, 132, 159;
- Sulla raccolta di materiali per la etnografia italiana, Firenze 1906;
- Per la etnografia italiana. Del modo di promuovere gli studi di etnografia italiana, Roma 1910;
- Atti del I Congresso di etnografia italiana, Roma( 1911, Perugia 1912, pp. 17–20;
- Due parole di programma, in Lares, I (1912), pp. 9–24;
- L'Etnografia, strumento di politica interna e coloniale, ibid., pp. 73–79.

== Bibliography ==
- Bo Beolens, Michael Watkins, Michael Grayson: The Eponym Dictionary of Mammals JHU Press, 2009, ISBN 9780801893049: S. 246
- De Simonis P., Dimpflmeier F. (a cura di), Lamberto Loria e la ragnatela dei suoi significati, fascicolo monografico di Lares. Quadrimestrale di studi demoetnoantropologici, Vol. LXXX/1, 2014.
- G.A. Colini, Collezione etnografica della Nuova Guinea formata dal dott. L. L., in Boll. della Soc. geografica italiana, s. 3, IV (1891)
- M. Régimbart (1892), Viaggio di Lamberto Loria nella Papuasia orientale. IV. Haliplidae, Dytiscidae, et Gyrinidae, in: Ann. Mus. Civ. Storia Nat. Genoa
- P. Mantegazza et al., Istruzioni etnologiche per il viaggio dalla Lapponia al Caucaso dei soci L. e Michela, in Arch. per l'antropologia e l'etnologia, XIII (1883), pp. 109–114;
- Puccini S., L'Itala gente dalle molte vite. Lamberto Loria e la Mostra di Etnografia Italiana del 1911, Melteni, Roma 2005.
- T. Salvadori, Caratteri di cinque specie nuove di uccelli della Nuova Guinea orientale-meridionale raccolti da Lamberto Loria, Genova 1894;
- T. Salvadori, Viaggio di Lamberto Loria nella Papuasia orientale. Collezioni ornitologiche, Genova 1890;
