= Brachyurophis approximans =

Conservation status
- Least Concern (IUCN 3.1)

Scientific classification
- Kingdom: Animalia
- Phylum: Chordata
- Class: Reptilia
- Order: Squamata
- Suborder: Serpentes
- Family: Elapidae
- Genus: Brachyurophis
- Species: B. approximans

Binomial name
- Brachyurophis approximans (Glauert, 1954)

Synonyms
- Rhynchoelaps approximans Glauert, 1954; Simoselaps approximans Mengden 1983

Species of Australian snake

Brachyurophis approximans, also known as the north-western shovel-nosed snake, is a species of mildly venomous burrowing snake that is endemic to Australia. The specific epithet approximans ("approaching") alludes to its similarity to Brachyurophis campbelli.

== Description ==
The species grows to about 30 cm in length. There are some 50–80 dark brown bands along the body, much broader than the pale bands separating them. The belly is whitish.

== Behaviour ==
The species is oviparous, with a clutch size of three. It feeds on reptile eggs.

== Distribution and habitat ==
The species occurs in the arid Pilbara and adjacent areas of north-west Western Australia, in stony soils vegetated with Acacia. The type locality is Muccan Station in the Pilbara.
