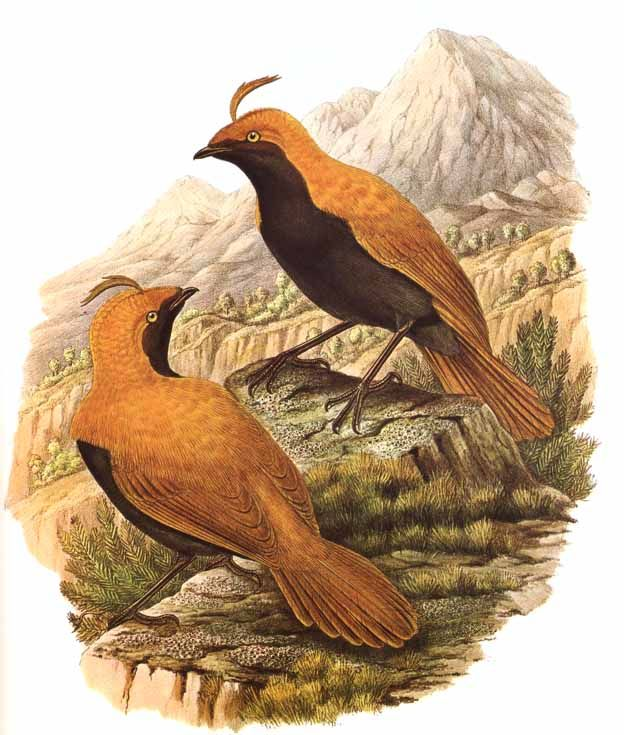
- Red satinbird

Scientific classification
- Kingdom: Animalia
- Phylum: Chordata
- Class: Aves
- Order: Passeriformes
- Family: Cnemophilidae
- Genus: Cnemophilus; De Vis, 1890

Type species
- Cnemophilus macgregorii De Vis, 1890

= Cnemophilus =

Genus of birds

Cnemophilus is a genus of satinbirds in the family Cnemophilidae, in which all three species are native to New Guinea mountain slopes and highlands in tropical forests. The generic name Cnemophilus is Latin for "mountain/slope-lover".

== Species ==
The genus contains two species.

Image	Common name	Scientific name
	Loria's satinbird	Cnemophilus loriae
	Crested satinbird	Cnemophilus macgregorii

== Etymology ==
The genus name Cnemophilus comes from Ancient Greek κνημός (knemós), meaning "mountain/slope", and φίλος (phílos), meaning "lover", referring to the species' fondness for mountain slopes.
