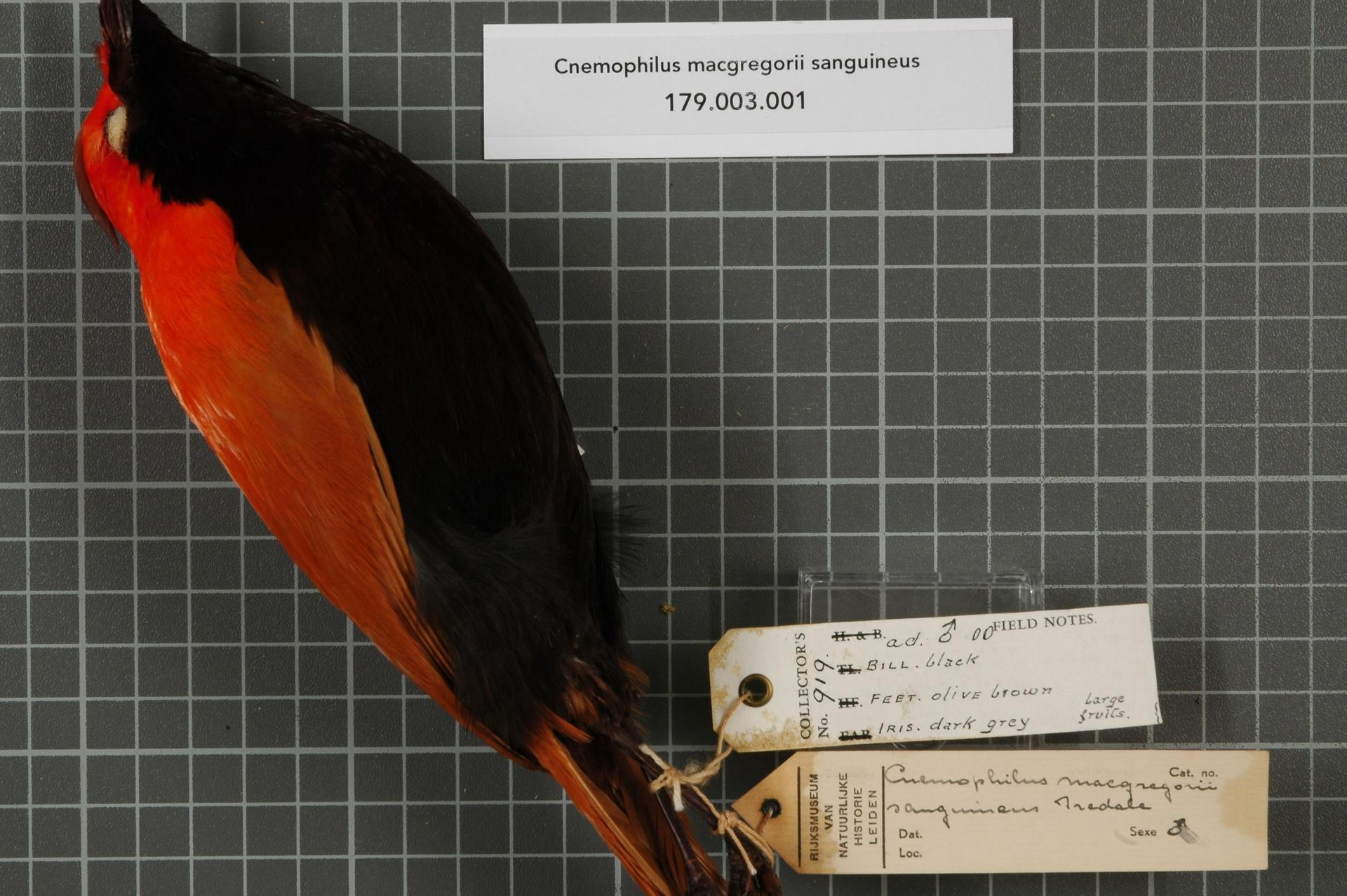
- Male specimen at the Naturalis Biodiversity Center

Conservation status
- Least Concern (IUCN 3.1)

Scientific classification
- Kingdom: Animalia
- Phylum: Chordata
- Class: Aves
- Order: Passeriformes
- Family: Cnemophilidae
- Genus: Cnemophilus
- Species: C. macgregorii
- Subspecies: C. m. sanguineus

Trinomial name
- Cnemophilus macgregorii sanguineus Iredale, 1948

Synonyms
- Cnemophilus sanguineus

= Red satinbird =

Species of bird

The red satinbird (Cnemophilus macgregorii sanguineus), commonly known as antenna satinbird or crested cnemophilus and formerly known as the sickle-crested bird-of-paradise, is a subspecies of bird in the family Cnemophilidae. It was formerly placed in the bird-of-paradise family Paradisaeidae until genetic work proved it was unrelated to those birds. It is found in the Bird's Tail Peninsula, Papua New Guinea.

== Taxonomy ==
The red satinbird was formally described in 1948 by the English ornithologist Tom Iredale. He considered the bird to be a subspecies of the crested satinbird and coined the trinomial name Cnemophilus macgregorii sanguineus. The generic epithet cnemophilus, means "mountain/slope-lover" and the subspecies epithet sanguineus means "bloody", referring to the males' bright reddish-orange to orange upperparts.

== Description ==
The male red satinbird sports bright, orange to reddish-orange upperparts, tail and most of the head is of the same color as well. The cheeks, chin and everything below is a blackish to black color. The feature that granted their former name, sickle-crested bird-of-paradise, is the small group of fine, brownish-purple crest plumes that are usually obscure in the head/crown feathers and is usually raised during displays. The female is plain olive brownish above and light brownish below. Like other members of the family, they have weak feet and an extremely wide gape; the mouth is pinkish in color, and the bill is light grayish.

They make harsh rasping calls and also some bell-like ringing sounds; some clicking and creaking calls have been recorded as well.

== Behavior and ecology ==
Red satinbirds are usually seen solitarily, pairs or occasionally in small groups at good fruiting trees. Like all satinbirds, their diet is exclusively fruits, in which their wide gapes are accustomed to. They are also sometimes seen feeding in association with birds-of-paradise in good feeding sites. Outside of fruits, they have been recorded taking earthworms and shelled molluscs. Breeding season not well studied, but is known to occur in August through January in the Eastern Central highlands. The female takes sole duty of rearing the chicks and building nests; she builds dome-shaped, globular nests reminiscent to bowerbirds' nests, made out of twigs, stems, leaves, etc. The clutch is most likely one egg, and it takes around 25–27 days for them to hatch. The chicks are fed mainly fruits and some invertebrates.

== Habitat and distribution ==
Red satinbirds are found in the mountains of south-eastern New Guinea, i.e. Kaijende Highlands and Mt. Giluwe. Red satinbirds are found in montane forests and forest edge, as well as subalpine forests at 2100–3650 m in altitude, but mostly at 2600–3500 m.
