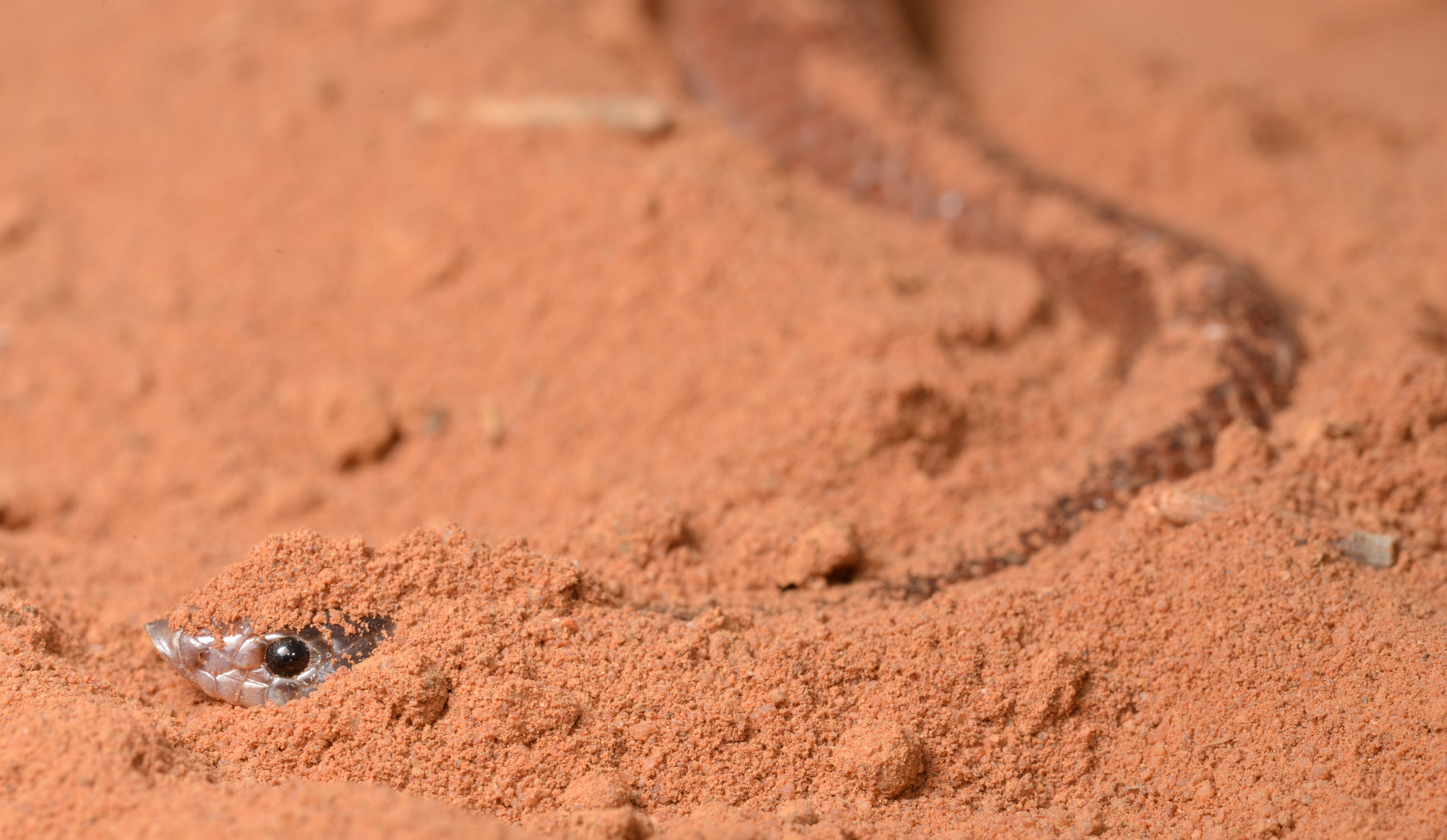

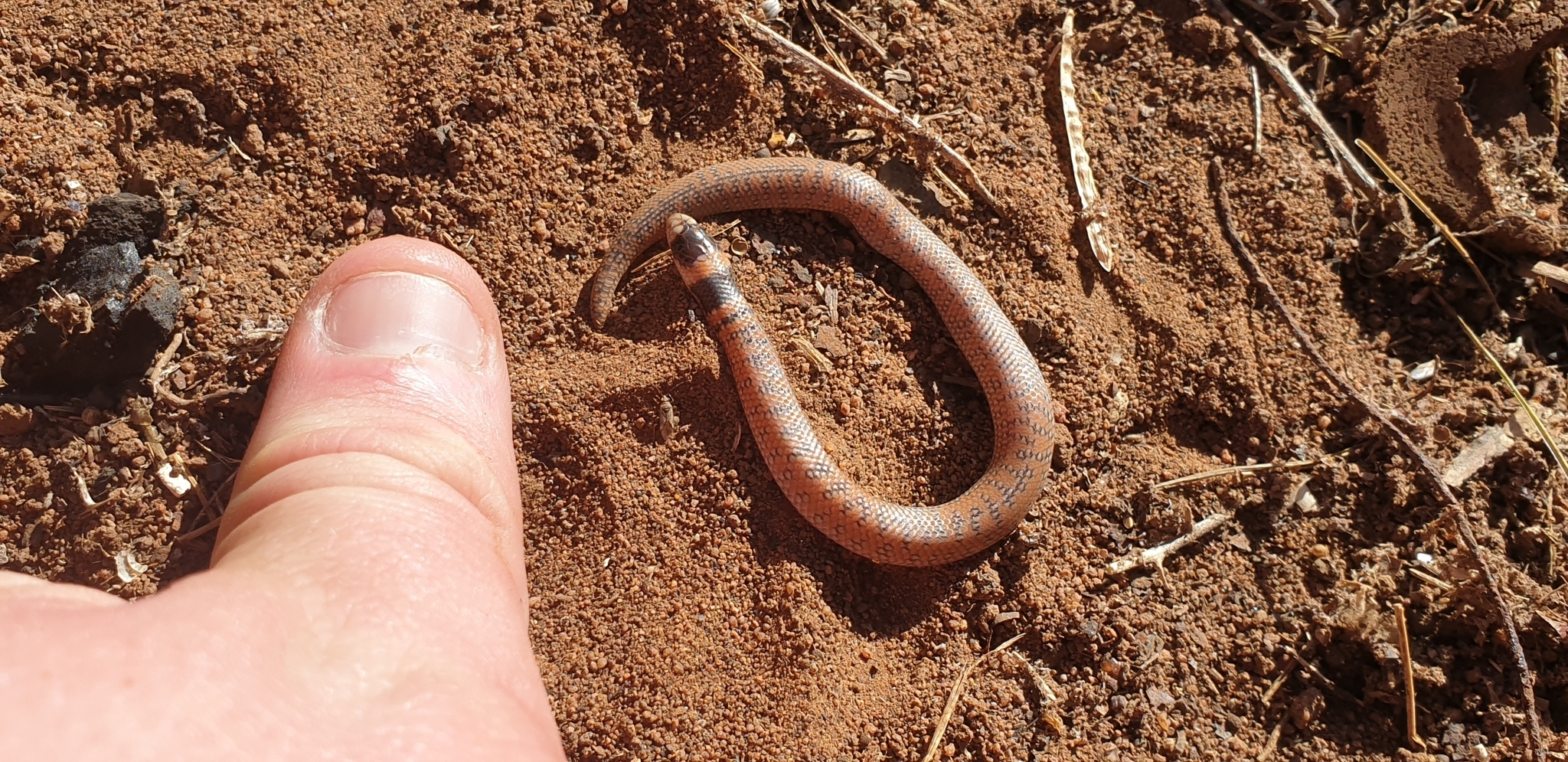

Conservation status
- Least Concern (IUCN 3.1)
- Least Concern (NCA)

Scientific classification
- Kingdom: Animalia
- Phylum: Chordata
- Class: Reptilia
- Order: Squamata
- Suborder: Serpentes
- Family: Elapidae
- Genus: Brachyurophis
- Species: B. autralis

Binomial name
- Brachyurophis autralis Krefft, 1864

Synonyms
- Simotes australis Krefft, 1864; Rhynchelaps australis (Boulenger, 1896); Austrelaps australis Simoselaps australis (Cogger, 1975)

= Brachyurophis australis =

Species of snake

Brachyurophis australis (coral snake) is a species of snake from the family Elapidae (common names - eastern shovel-nosed snake, coral snake, Australian coral snake) and is a species endemic to Australia. Its common name reflects its shovel nose specialisation.

== Description ==
The eastern shovel-nosed snake is a small snake. The top of its body is pink or orange to reddish-brown with irregular narrow cross-bands of cream with dark edges. It has two large dark bands; one across its head and the other across its nape. Its underside is whitish. The average length of a coral snake is 30 centimetres or 12 inches, and maximum length is 45 centimetres or 18 inches. It has an upturned blunt snout.

== Taxonomy ==
Brachyurophis australis is one of eight currently recognised species within the genus Brachyurophis. It was first described by Gerard Krefft in 1864 as Simotes australis.

B. australis is differentiated by B. fasciolatus (both occurring in New South Wales) by facial features. In B. australis the nasal scale and preocular scale are in contact and the profile of the snout is more pointed; in B. fasciolatus the nasal scale and preocular scale are separated by the prefrontal scale and the snout appears more rounded in profile.

== Distribution & habitat ==
Brachyurophis australis is found in eastern Australia, in South Australia, Victoria, inland New South Wales and Queensland.

Distribution is from central South to eastern South Australia, North Western Victoria, mostly East of the Great Dividing Range in New South Wales and into Queensland up to Townsville, although found the coast in North East New South Wales and South East Queensland. Preferred habitat for the coral snake is open woodland, grassland and arid scrub in mulga, brigalow, open woodland and mallee associations on heavy clay, rocky or sandy soils. The eastern shovel-nosed snake has a burrowing habit and can be found under rocks, logs, or leaf litter during the day.

== Behaviour & Diet ==
The eastern shovel-nosed snake is a burrowing species, its "shovel" shaped nose is an adaptation to its fossorial habits. It is nocturnal and can be spotted on the surface of the ground at night. Its diet consists of lizards and reptile eggs. It is considered venomous but virtually harmless.

== Reproduction ==
The eastern shovel-nosed snake is oviparous, laying 4-6 eggs in a clutch.

== Conservation status ==
The conservation status of B. australis is assessed by the Queensland Government as being of "Least Concern" and is similarly assessed by the IUCN.
