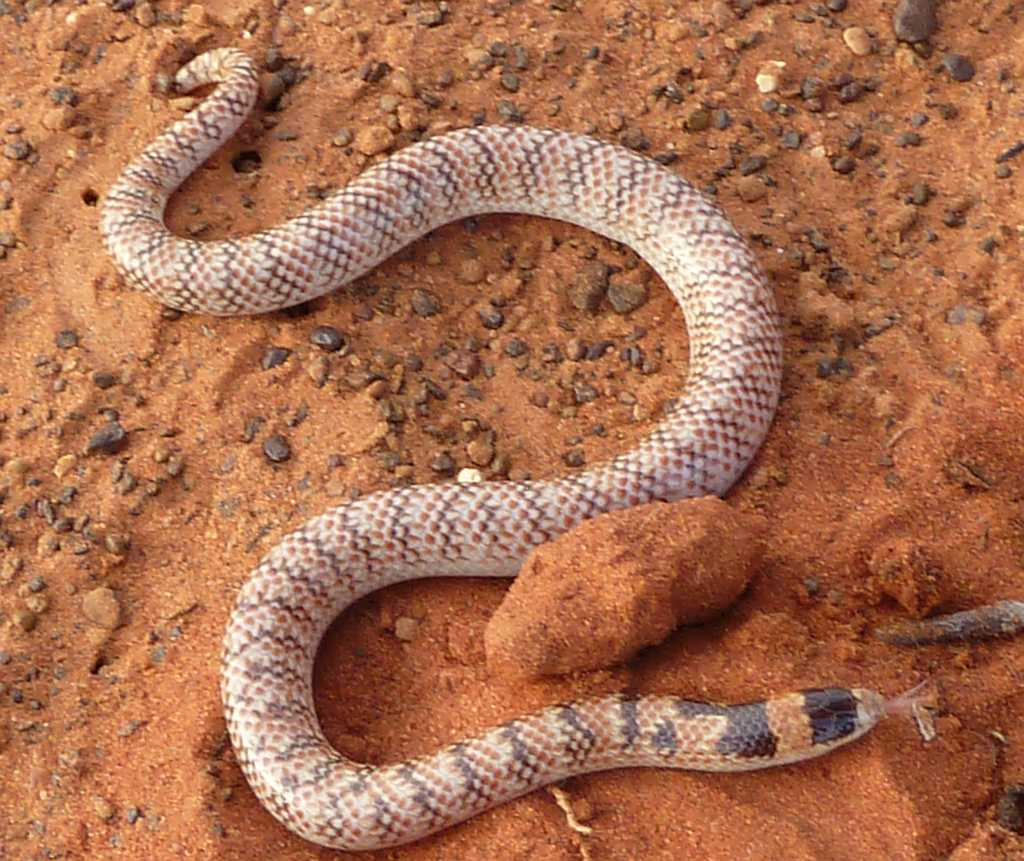

Conservation status
- Least Concern (IUCN 3.1)

Scientific classification
- Kingdom: Animalia
- Phylum: Chordata
- Class: Reptilia
- Order: Squamata
- Suborder: Serpentes
- Family: Elapidae
- Genus: Brachyurophis
- Species: B. fasciolatus

Binomial name
- Brachyurophis fasciolatus (Günther, 1872)
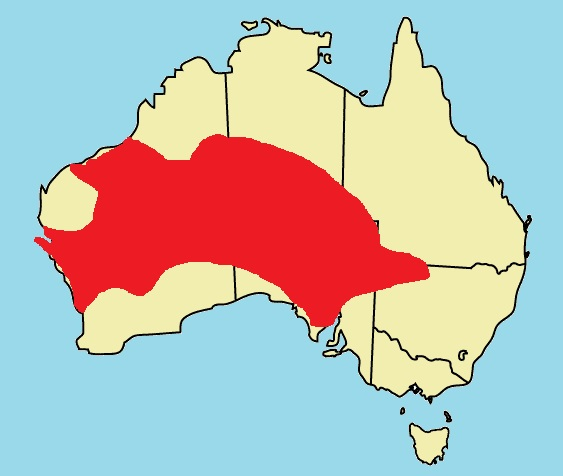

Synonyms
- Rhinelaps fasciolatus; Rhynchoelaps fasciolatus; Simoselaps fasciolatus

= Brachyurophis fasciolatus =

Species of snake

Brachyurophis fasciolatus is a species of snake from the family Elapidae, commonly named the narrow-banded shovel-nosed snake, or narrow-banded burrowing snake, and is a species endemic to Australia. Its common names reflect its shovel nose specialization, burrowing behaviour and banded body colour.

== Description ==
The narrow-banded shovel-nosed snake is on average 30 cm (12 in) in total length, reaching to approximately 40 cm (16 in) in total length. Identification of B. fasciolatus from other species of this genus can be made by inspection of the preocular and nasal scales. This species has a scale situated between the two scales whereas other species of this genus have the preocular and nasal scale in contact. The Narrow-banded burrowing snake has cream to white coloured ventral scales, of which there are 140-175, and 15-30 subcaudal scales of which are divided. The anal scale is also divided. The dorsal scales are brightly coloured with a pale reddish-brown to cream coloured background and black-tipped scales that form 50 or more narrow bands across the body, giving the snake its banded appearance. The snout is light in colour, cream or brown and the head is black with a narrow lighter coloured band separating the black head and nape into two sections. There are 17 rows of scales mid-body on average.

== Taxonomy ==
Brachyurophis fasciolatus is one of eight currently recognised species within the genus Brachyurophis. There are two subspecies, Brachyurophis fasciolatus fasciatus and Brachyurophis fasciolatus fasciolatus. Originally named Rhinelaps fasciolatus when first described by Günther in 1872, Brachyurophis fasciolatus was renamed multiple times until its most recent rename in the early 2000s. This most recent reclassification for this species, moved this species into the genus Brachyurophis. Synonyms include Rhinelaps fasciolatus (Günther 1872), Rhynchoelaps fasciolatus (Boulenger 1896), and Simoselaps fasciolatus (Cogger 1983).

=== Phylogeny ===
Brachyurophis fasciolatus belongs to the Simoselaps species group, which is the sister group to other Australian oxyuranines. This is one of two lineages of Australian elapids and sea snakes which have evolved burrowing; the two lineages may not be each other's closest relatives, indicating that burrowing lifestyles may have multiple origins within the group.

== Ecology, distribution and habitat ==
Brachyurophis fasciolatus is distributed throughout mainland Australia, except Victoria, in arid and coastal zones. The subspecies B. fasciolatus fasciolatus is found within the Western regions of Australia and B. fasciolatus fasciatus is distributed throughout central Australia. The IUCN risk assessment has B. fasciolatus assessed as Least Concern, globally, and the New South Wales department of Environment & Heritage lists this species as Vulnerable. Brachyurophis fasciolatus a fossorial snake with a habitat preference of slopes and crests, sandy habitat such as savannas, deserts, grasslands and shrubland areas, including spinifex dunes.

== Behaviour and reproduction ==
The narrow-banded shovel-nosed snake is a nocturnal fossorial species, burrowing in sandy habitats. This species emerges to the surface on warm nights to forage for food. Reproduction occurs via sexual reproduction. This snake is oviparous with an average clutch size of three to five eggs. Oviposition (egg-laying) and hatching occurs during the warmer months with late spring to early summer as the expected time of oviposition with eggs hatched by late summer to early autumn (January - March).

== Diet and venom ==
The narrow-banded burrowing snake forages on the surface for small terrestrial lizards and their eggs. Prey preference appears to be towards small skinks and their eggs. Two genus of skink are considered to be preferred prey items are Lerista and Ctenotus. These small skinks are long and slender, with often overlapping habitat use such as in Lerista sp. which are also fossorial. Whilst B. fasciolatus is a venomous snake its venom is generally considered mild to humans*.

*Note: All snake bites should be treated as serious, regardless of envenoming.

== Predators and threats ==
The IUCN Red List considers threats to this species as minimal due to its large distribution in low human populated areas. Furthermore, in New South Wales its distribution covers a small area of its total range and threats are largely described as habitat fragmentation and damage to soil from undulates and farming practices. Little information is available on specific predators of this species, however there are likely opportunistic predators such as other snakes and avian species.
