= Ethel A. King =

Australian scientific illustrator (1879–1939)

- Born: Ethel Anna King; 1879; Lismore, New South Wales, Australia
- Died: 1 January 1939 (aged 59–60); Darlinghurst, New South Wales, Australia
- Known for: Scientific illustration
- Notable work: 137 drawings for Snakes of Australia

Ethel Anna King (1879 – 1 January 1939) was an Australian scientific illustrator of snakes, fish and botany.

== Biography ==
Born in Lismore in 1879, King moved to Sydney to study painting and drawing with Julian Ashton and Dattilo Rubbo. In 1922 she was appointed assistant to Margaret Flockton, artist working for Joseph Maiden, director of the Botanical Gardens in Sydney to illustrate his work.

Many examples of her work are held in the Australian Museum, where she worked on commission in the 1920s and 30s.

In 1925 she was commissioned to prepare fish exhibits for display at the New Zealand and South Seas International Exhibition, including a 250 lb (113.4 kg) Giant groper (Epinephelus lanceolatus).

She contributed illustrations to the first edition of the Australian Encyclopedia and made 137 colour illustrations for J. R. Kinghorn's Snakes of Australia, which were described by David G. Stead, President of the Naturalists' Society of New South Wales as "render[ing] the work quite unique and absolutely invaluable to naturalist and bushman alike, as with their aid it is easily possible to identify every species".

A colour plate she created for Charles Barrett's Australian Animals (1932) was described as "one of the finest illustrations of its kind yet published in this country" by The Melbourne Herald.

Shortly before her death she was appointed to serve as anatomical artist at the Institute of Anatomy in Canberra.

== Works ==
=== Reference books ===
- Froggatt, Walter W. (1927). Forest Insects and Timber Borers. Illustrated by E. A. King. Sydney, New South Wales: A. J. Kent, Government Printer.
- Kinghorn, J. R. (1929). Snakes of Australia. Illustrated by E. A. King. Sydney, Australia: Angus & Robertson.

=== Children's books ===
- Honey, W. H. (1934). Bush Creatures. Illustrated by E. A. King. Sydney, New South Wales: W. H. Honey Publishing Co.
- Higgins, Kathleen (1937). Betty in Bushland. Illustrated by Pixie O'Harris and E. A. King. Sydney, New South Wales: Angus & Robertson.

== Death ==
King died on 1 January 1939 at a private hospital in Darlinghurst, New South Wales and was cremated.
