= Brachyurophis incinctus =

Conservation status
- Least Concern (IUCN 3.1)
- Least Concern (NCA)

Scientific classification
- Kingdom: Animalia
- Phylum: Chordata
- Class: Reptilia
- Order: Squamata
- Suborder: Serpentes
- Family: Elapidae
- Genus: Brachyurophis
- Species: B. incinctus

Binomial name
- Brachyurophis incinctus (Storr, 1968)

Synonyms
- Simoselaps incinctus Vermicella semifasciata incincta

Species of snake

Brachyurophis incinctus is a species of snake from the family Elapidae, commonly named the unbanded shovel-nosed snake, and is a species endemic to Australia. Its common name reflects its shovel nose specialisation, burrowing behaviour and the fact that it is not banded on its body.

== Description ==
The unbanded shovel-nosed snake is an oviparous, mildly venomous, and small (less than 400 millimetres or 16 inches) burrowing snake, which is not banded on its body.

== Taxonomy ==
Brachyurophis incinctus is one of eight currently recognised species within the genus Brachyurophis. It was first described by Glen Milton Storr in 1968 as Vermicella semifasciata subsp. incincta.

== Distribution & habitat ==
Brachyurophis incinctus is found in central Australia (in the Northern Territory) and in western Queensland, in grasslands, shrublands and deserts.

== Conservation status ==
The conservation status of B. incinctus is assessed by the Queensland Government as being of "Least Concern" and is similarly assessed by the IUCN, with the comment that it is "unlikely that any major threat is impacting this species".
