= Brachyurophis morrisi =

Arnhem shovel-nosed snake

Conservation status
- Least Concern (IUCN 3.1)

Scientific classification
- Kingdom: Animalia
- Phylum: Chordata
- Class: Reptilia
- Order: Squamata
- Suborder: Serpentes
- Family: Elapidae
- Genus: Brachyurophis
- Species: B. morrisi

Binomial name
- Brachyurophis morrisi (Horner, 1998)

Synonyms
- Simoselaps morrisi Horner, 1998

Species of Australian snake

Brachyurophis morrisi, also known commonly as the Arnhem shovel-nosed snake, is a species of small, mildly venomous, burrowing snake in the subfamily Hydrophiinae of the family Elapidae. The species is endemic to Australia.

== Etymology ==
The specific epithet, morrisi, honours Australian author and naturalist Ian James Morris, who was the first to collect the species in 1970, for his contributions to the knowledge of the animals of the Northern Territory.

== Description ==
Brachyurophis morrisi grows to an average total length (tail included) of about 30 cm (12 in). The head is pale yellowish brown. Dorsally, the body is orange-brown in colour and unbanded apart from a dark band across the nape. The body scales are often dark-edged.

== Geographic distribution ==
The geographic range of Brachyurophis morrisi is limited to northern Arnhem Land in the tropical Top End of the Northern Territory.

== Habitat ==
The preferred natural habitat of Brachyurophis morrisi is forest or savanna on sandy soil dominated by Eucalyptus miniata.

== Diet ==
Brachyurophis morrisi feeds on reptile eggs.

== Reproduction ==
Brachyurophis morrisi is oviparous.
