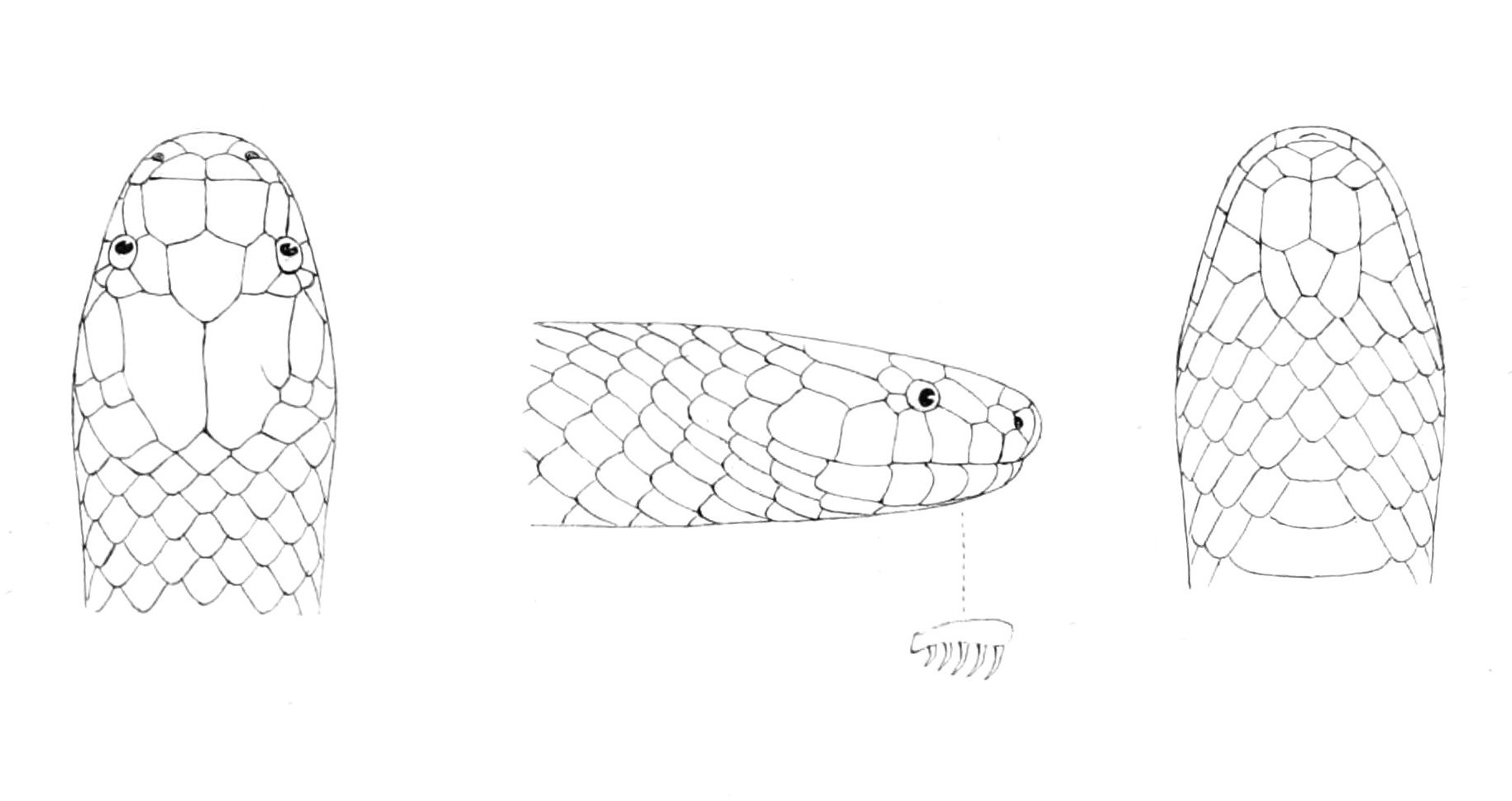

Conservation status
- Least Concern (IUCN 3.1)

Scientific classification
- Kingdom: Animalia
- Phylum: Chordata
- Class: Reptilia
- Order: Squamata
- Suborder: Serpentes
- Family: Elapidae
- Genus: Toxicocalamus
- Species: T. loriae

Binomial name
- Toxicocalamus loriae (Boulenger, 1897)

Synonyms
- Apistocalamus loriae Boulenger, 1897; Apistocalamus pratti Boulenger, 1904; Apisthocalamus loriae — Boulenger, 1908; Toxicocalamus loriae — McDowell, 1969

= Toxicocalamus loriae =

Species of snake

Toxicocalamus loriae, also known commonly as the Loria forest snake, is a species of venomous snake in the family Elapidae. The species is endemic to New Guinea (including some outlying islands) and occurs in both Western New Guinea (Indonesia) and Papua New Guinea.

== Etymology ==
The specific name, loriae, is in honor of Italian ethnologist Lamberto Loria.

== Habitat ==
The preferred natural habitat of T. loriae is forest, at altitudes from sea level to 1,830 m (6,000 ft).

== Behavior ==
T. loriae is diurnal and fossorial.

== Diet ==
T. loriae preys upon earthworms, fly larvae, land snails, and other small invertebrates.

== Reproduction ==
T. loriae is oviparous.
