= James Roy Kinghorn =

Australian naturalist, and museum curator

James Roy Kinghorn (12 October 1891 – 4 March 1983), generally known as Roy, or J. R. Kinghorn, was an Australian naturalist, a longtime curator at the Australian Museum, and a noted lecturer and broadcaster.

== Early years ==
Roy Kinghorn was born in Richmond, New South Wales, the youngest of three children of Rev. James Kinghorn (1861–1912) and his wife (Bertha) Ethel, née Campbell (ca.1866–1942). He was educated at Ellengowan School, Bathurst, All Saints' College, Bathurst and the Sydney Church of England Grammar School.

In 1907 he was accepted as a cadet at the Australian Museum, Sydney, specialising in crustaceans. He attended lectures at Sydney University and studied part-time at Sydney Technical College, but after failing an examination at the College, was transferred to a clerical position at the Museum.

== Wartime and later career ==
Kinghorn enlisted with the AIF in June 1915 and served during World War I in Egypt and Lemnos with the Dental Corps and with the Field Artillery Brigade, mostly as a driver, but after receiving a severe knee injury in December 1917 was repatriated to Australia, and was discharged as permanently medically unfit in July 1918. He was to serve as recruiting officer for the 2nd AIF during the Second World War.

He returned to the Australian Museum in 1918 and was appointed zoologist in charge of reptiles and amphibians; three years later birds were added to his portfolio.

He was appointed Assistant Director of the Australian Museum around 1951 and retired in 1956.

== Lecturer and broadcaster ==
Kinghorn was a popular and prolific lecturer on zoological subjects, beginning around 1924.

His interest in broadcasting began around the same time, with talks and stories on the Children's Hour on Farmer's Radio Service (later 2FC). Among his last media appearances was (as "Linnaeus" the naturalist) in a weekly spot during the last decade of ABC radio's Argonauts' Club.

He was a regular on Captain Fortune Show, a pioneering TV series of the 1950s and the "Spying on Nature" segment of "Wednesday Wonderbox" children's show on ABC-TV (which also featured Mr. Squiggle) in the 1960s.

== Family life ==
Kinghorn married Winifred Mance (died 1977) on 12 November 1921. They had no children.

== Publications ==
- Large Non-venomous Snakes of Australia Australian Museum Magazine vol.1 issue 2 September 1921.
- Kinghorn, J.R. 1923. A New Genus of Elapine Snake from Northern Australia. Records of the Australian Museum 14 (1): 42–45 + Plate VII.
  ("Oxyuranus, gen. nov.", p. 42.)
- Snakes of Australia, illustrated by Ethel A. King, 1929, New, large format, edition ed. Harold Cogger (1935– ) 1964
- Dangerous Snakes of the South-West Pacific Area with Charles Kellaway (1943). This pocket guide was published for American troops serving in the region.
- Kinghorn, J. Roy 1929 Herpetological notes No. I Records of the Australian Museum 17 (2): 76–84
- Kinghorn, JR 1929 Rec. Austral. Mus., Sydney, 17: 77
- Kinghorn, J. Reptiles and Roy 1924 batrachian from south and south-west Australia. Records of the Australian Museum 14 (3): 163–183

== Societies ==
- Zoological Society of London (Corresponding Member)
- Wildlife Preservation Society of Australia
- California Academy of Sciences (Fellow)
- Royal Zoological Society of New South Wales (and its President 1927–1928, 1950–1956)
- Royal Australian Ornithologists' Union (council member)

== Recognition ==
- Diploma of the British Museums Association, 1935

A species of snake, Simalia kinghorni, was named for him, as well as a species of lizard, Proablepharus kinghorni.

== See also ==
French Wikipedia entry
