= Carlia johnstonei =

Conservation status
- Least Concern (IUCN 3.1)

Scientific classification
- Kingdom: Animalia
- Phylum: Chordata
- Class: Reptilia
- Order: Squamata
- Family: Scincidae
- Genus: Carlia
- Species: C. johnstonei

Binomial name
- Carlia johnstonei Storr, 1974

Species of lizard

Carlia johnstonei, also known commonly as the rough brown rainbow-skink, is a species of lizard in the family Scincidae. The species is endemic to the Australian state of Western Australia.

== Etymology ==
The specific name, johnstonei, is in honor of Australian ornithologist Ronald Eric Johnstone.

== Geographic range ==
C. johnstonei is found in Kimberley region, which is the northernmost region of Western Australia.

== Habitat ==
The preferred natural habitats of C. johnstonei are forest, grassland, and freshwater wetlands, at altitudes as high as 290 m (950 ft).

== Description ==
C. johnstonei has two strong keels on each dorsal scale. The ear opening has a long sharp anterior lobule. Small for its genus, average adult snout-to-vent length (SVL) is 4.3 cm (1.7 in).

== Reproduction ==
C. johnstonei is oviparous.
