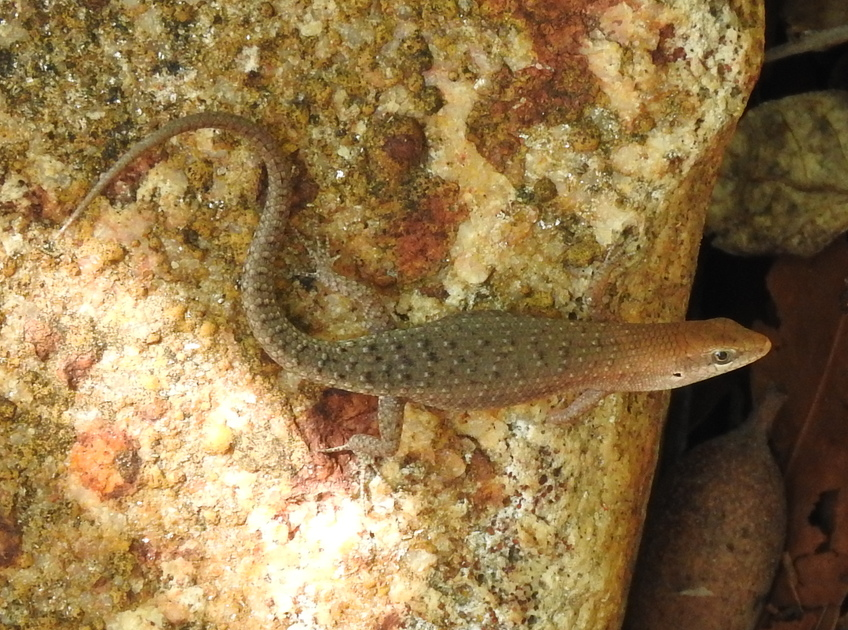

Conservation status
- Least Concern (IUCN 3.1)

Scientific classification
- Kingdom: Animalia
- Phylum: Chordata
- Class: Reptilia
- Order: Squamata
- Suborder: Scinciformata
- Infraorder: Scincomorpha
- Family: Eugongylidae
- Genus: Carlia
- Species: C. amax

Binomial name
- Carlia amax Storr, 1974

= Carlia amax =

Species of lizard

Carlia amax is a species of skink, commonly known as the bauxite rainbow-skink, in the genus Carlia. It is native to northern Australia.
