= Ronald Eric Johnstone =

Australian ornithologist and herpetologist

Ronald Eric Johnstone (born 1949) is an Australian ornithologist and herpetologist who worked for the Western Australian Museum for many years. The bat species Otomops johnstonei is named in his honour. The lizard species Carlia johnstonei is named in his honor.

== Publications ==
- Storr GM, Smith LA, Johnstone RE (1983). Lizards of Western Australia II: Dragons and Monitors. Perth: Western Australian Museum. 113 pp.
- Storr GM, Smith LA, Johnstone RE (1999). Lizards of Western Australia. I. Skinks, Revised Edition. Perth: Western Australian Museum. 291 pp. ISBN 978-0730726562.
- Johnstone RE (1988). "Ben Island, Archipelago of the Recherche, Western Australia". Corella 12 (3): 89–90.
- Johnstone RE (1990). Mangroves and mangrove birds of Western Australia. Records of the Western Australian Museum. Supplement No. 32. 120 pp.
- Johnstone RE, Storr GM (1998-2004). Handbook of Western Australian Birds. Perth: Western Australian Museum. ISBN 0730712087 (vol. 1), ISBN 1-920843-11-6 (vol. 2).
- Johnstone RE (2001). Checklist of the Birds of Western Australia. Records of the Western Australian Museum. Supplement No. 63. pp. 75–90.
- Coate, Kevin H.; Johnstone, Ronald E. (2007). Seabirds and shipwrecks: exploring the Houtman Abrolhos Archipelago. Perth: Department of Environment and Conservation. Abrolhos Islands, Western Australia, 11–18 December 2007 Expedition was offered by Landscope, the Department of Environment and Conservation's (DEC's) quarterly magazine in association with UWA Extension, The University of Western Australia.
