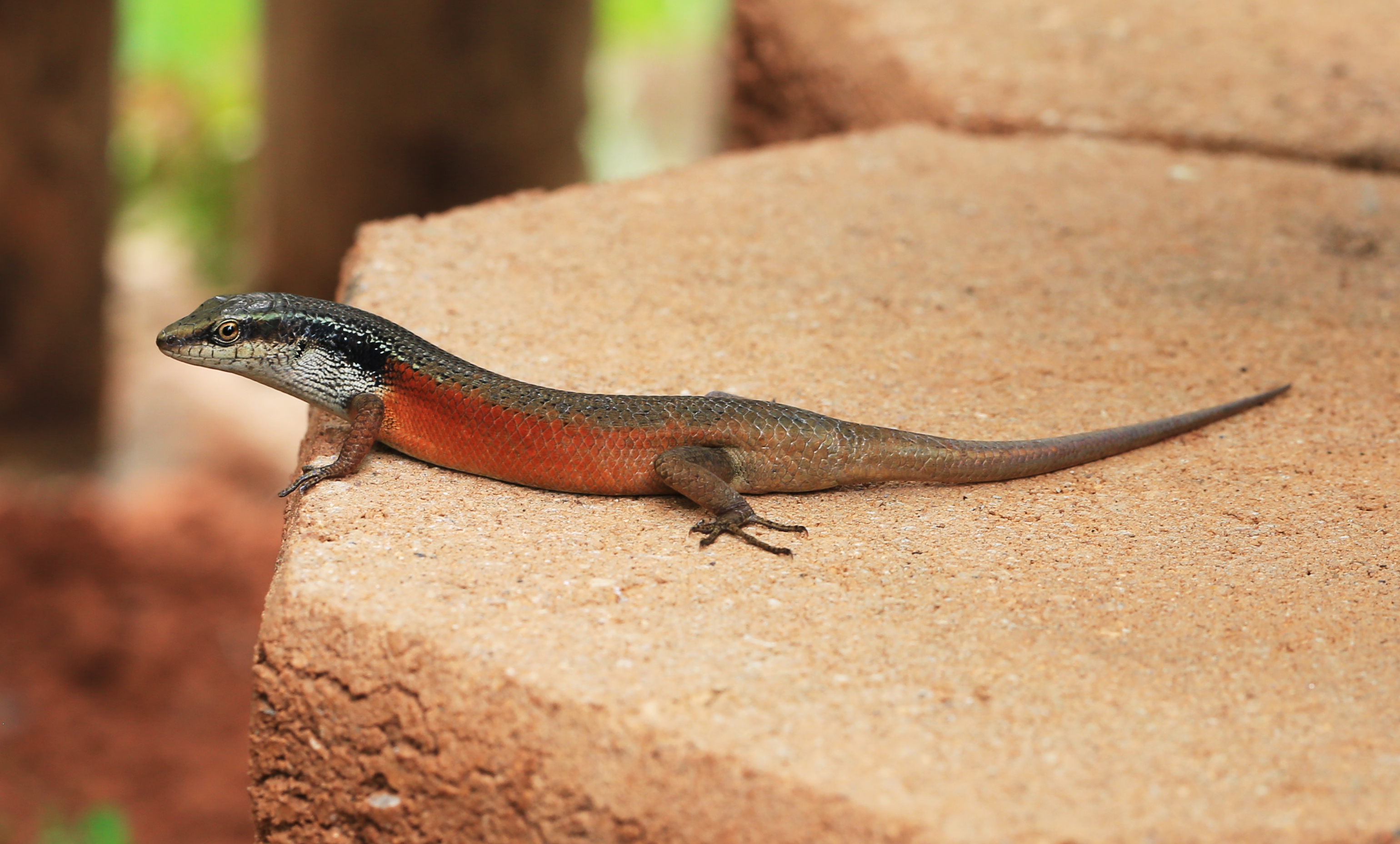

Conservation status
- Least Concern (IUCN 3.1)

Scientific classification
- Kingdom: Animalia
- Phylum: Chordata
- Class: Reptilia
- Order: Squamata
- Suborder: Scinciformata
- Infraorder: Scincomorpha
- Family: Eugongylidae
- Genus: Carlia
- Species: C. longipes

Binomial name
- Carlia longipes Macleay,1877

Synonyms
- Heteropus longipes Macleay, 1877; Heteropus cheverti Macleay, 1877

= Carlia longipes =

Species of lizard

Carlia longipes is a species of skink, commonly known as closed-litter rainbow-skink, in the subfamily Eugongylinae.

== Habitat and range ==
An Australian skink found in open forest and the edges of rainforest, from Hinchinbrook Island to Cooktown in north-east Queensland, Cape York Peninsula and eastern Arnhem Land in the Northern Territory.

== Description ==
It has a snout to vent length of 55mm, with four fingers and five toes. The ear opening is vertical or circular with pointed scales on the front edge. The body is brown with bronze sides, and a black stripe runs from the nostril to behind the foreleg. The back scales have a rounded hind edge, and the breeding male has a white throat. A similar species is Carlia rostralis.
