= Carlia gracilis =

Conservation status
- Least Concern (IUCN 3.1)

Scientific classification
- Kingdom: Animalia
- Phylum: Chordata
- Class: Reptilia
- Order: Squamata
- Suborder: Scinciformata
- Infraorder: Scincomorpha
- Family: Eugongylidae
- Genus: Carlia
- Species: C. gracilis

Binomial name
- Carlia gracilis Storr, 1974
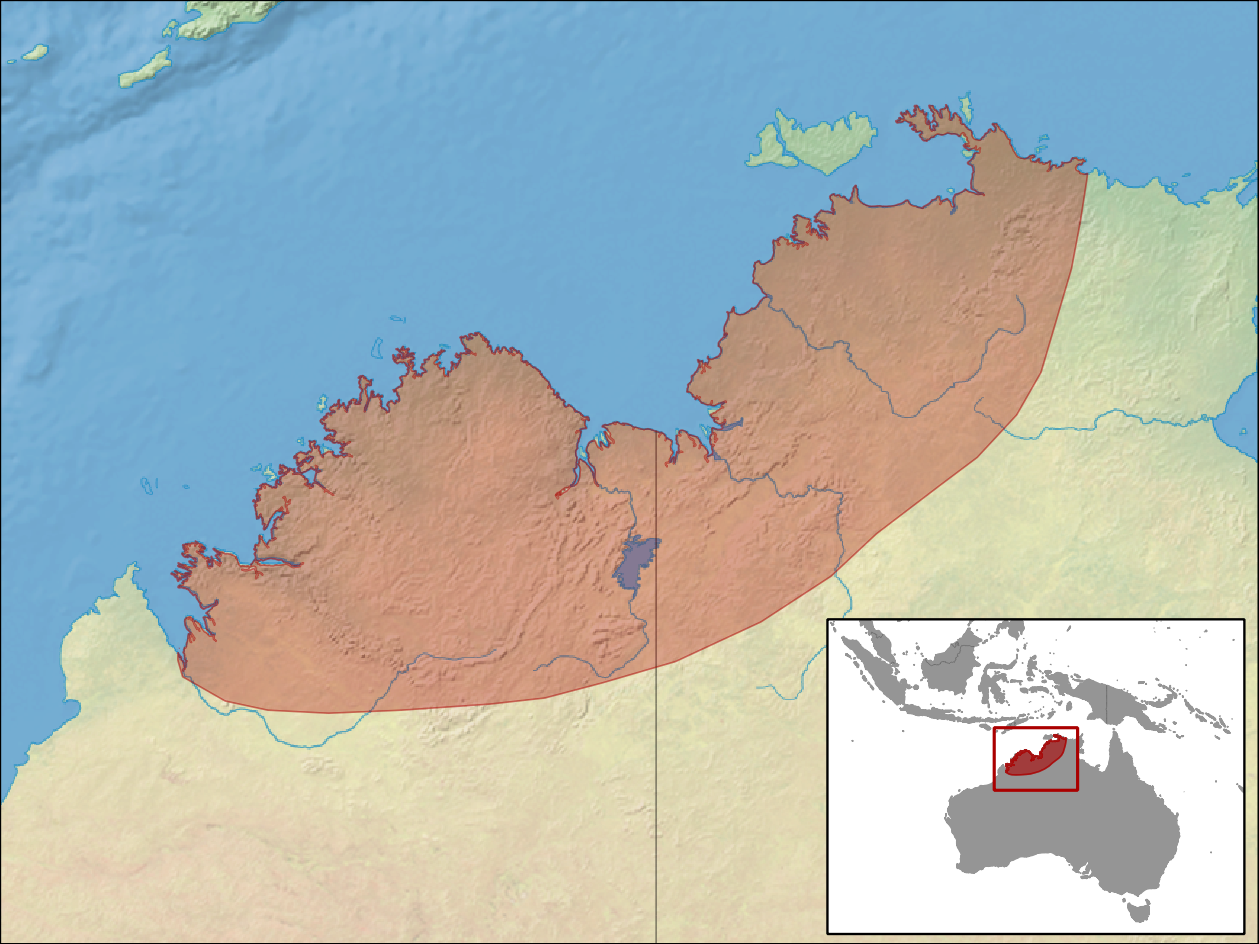

Species of skink

Carlia gracilis, the slender rainbow skink, is a species of skink in the genus Carlia. It is native to Northern Territory and Western Australia in Australia.
