= Carlia rufilatus =

Conservation status
- Least Concern (IUCN 3.1)

Scientific classification
- Kingdom: Animalia
- Phylum: Chordata
- Class: Reptilia
- Order: Squamata
- Suborder: Scinciformata
- Infraorder: Scincomorpha
- Family: Eugongylidae
- Genus: Carlia
- Species: C. rufilatus

Binomial name
- Carlia rufilatus Storr, 1974

Species of lizard

Carlia rufilatus, the red-sided rainbow-skink, is a species of skink in the genus Carlia. It is endemic to Northern Territory and Western Australia in Australia.
