= Carlia inconnexa =

Conservation status
- Least Concern (IUCN 3.1)

Scientific classification
- Kingdom: Animalia
- Phylum: Chordata
- Class: Reptilia
- Order: Squamata
- Suborder: Scinciformata
- Infraorder: Scincomorpha
- Family: Eugongylidae
- Genus: Carlia
- Species: C. inconnexa

Binomial name
- Carlia inconnexa Ingram & Covacevich, 1989

Species of reptile

Carlia inconnexa, the Whitsunday rainbow skink, is a species of skink in the genus Carlia. It is endemic to Whitsunday, Hook, and Lindeman Island in Australia.
