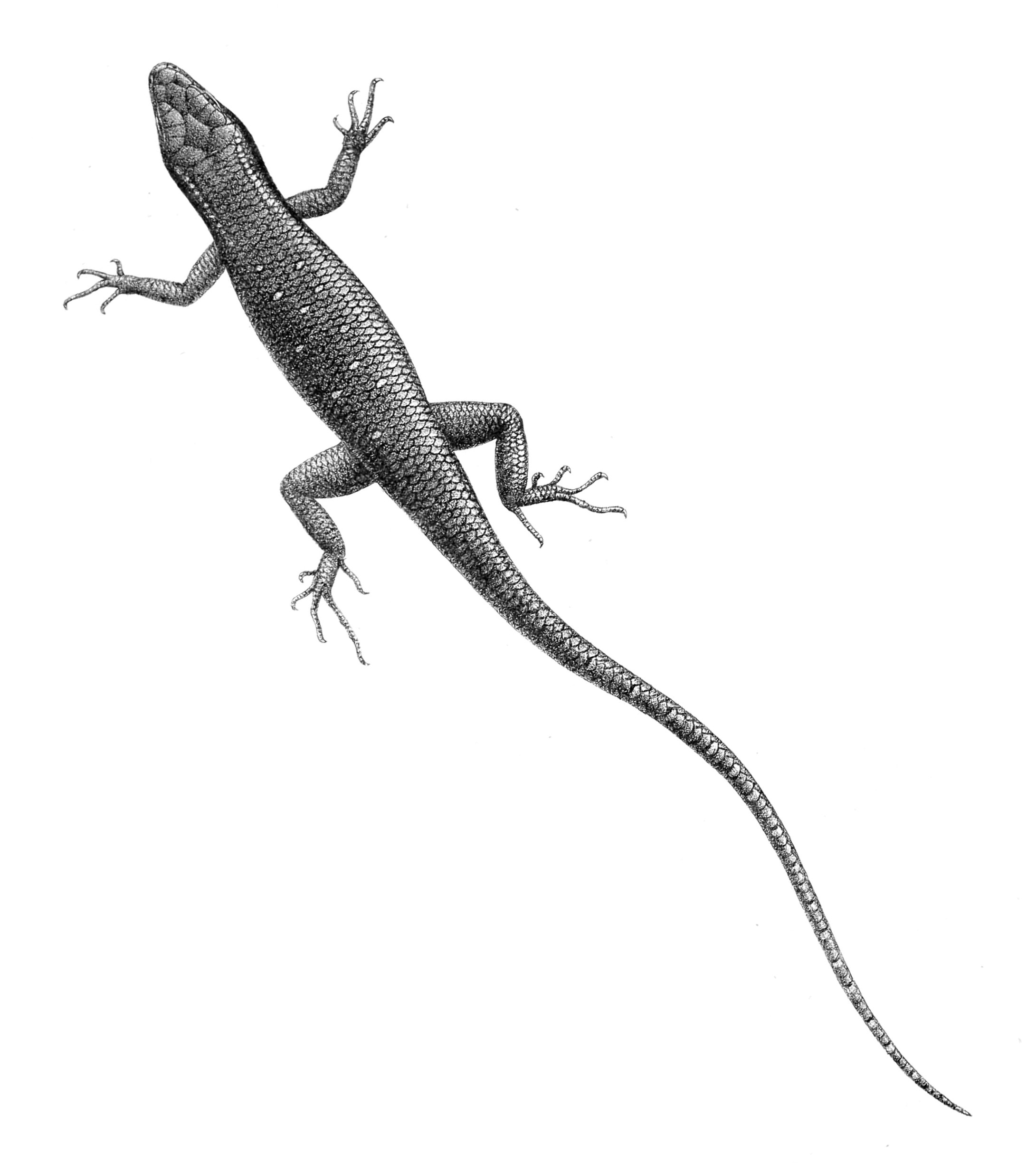

Conservation status
- Least Concern (IUCN 3.1)

Scientific classification
- Kingdom: Animalia
- Phylum: Chordata
- Class: Reptilia
- Order: Squamata
- Suborder: Scinciformata
- Infraorder: Scincomorpha
- Family: Eugongylidae
- Genus: Carlia
- Species: C. luctuosa

Binomial name
- Carlia luctuosa (Peters & Doria, 1878)

= Carlia luctuosa =

Species of reptile

Carlia luctuosa is a species of skink in the genus Carlia. It is endemic to Papua New Guinea.
