= Carlia nigrauris =

Conservation status
- Near Threatened (IUCN 3.1)

Scientific classification
- Kingdom: Animalia
- Phylum: Chordata
- Class: Reptilia
- Order: Squamata
- Family: Scincidae
- Genus: Carlia
- Species: C. nigrauris

Binomial name
- Carlia nigrauris Zug, 2010

Species of lizard

Carlia nigrauris is a species of skink in the genus Carlia. It is native to Indonesia and is distinguished from other members of the Carlia genus by its black coloration and relatively larger size.
