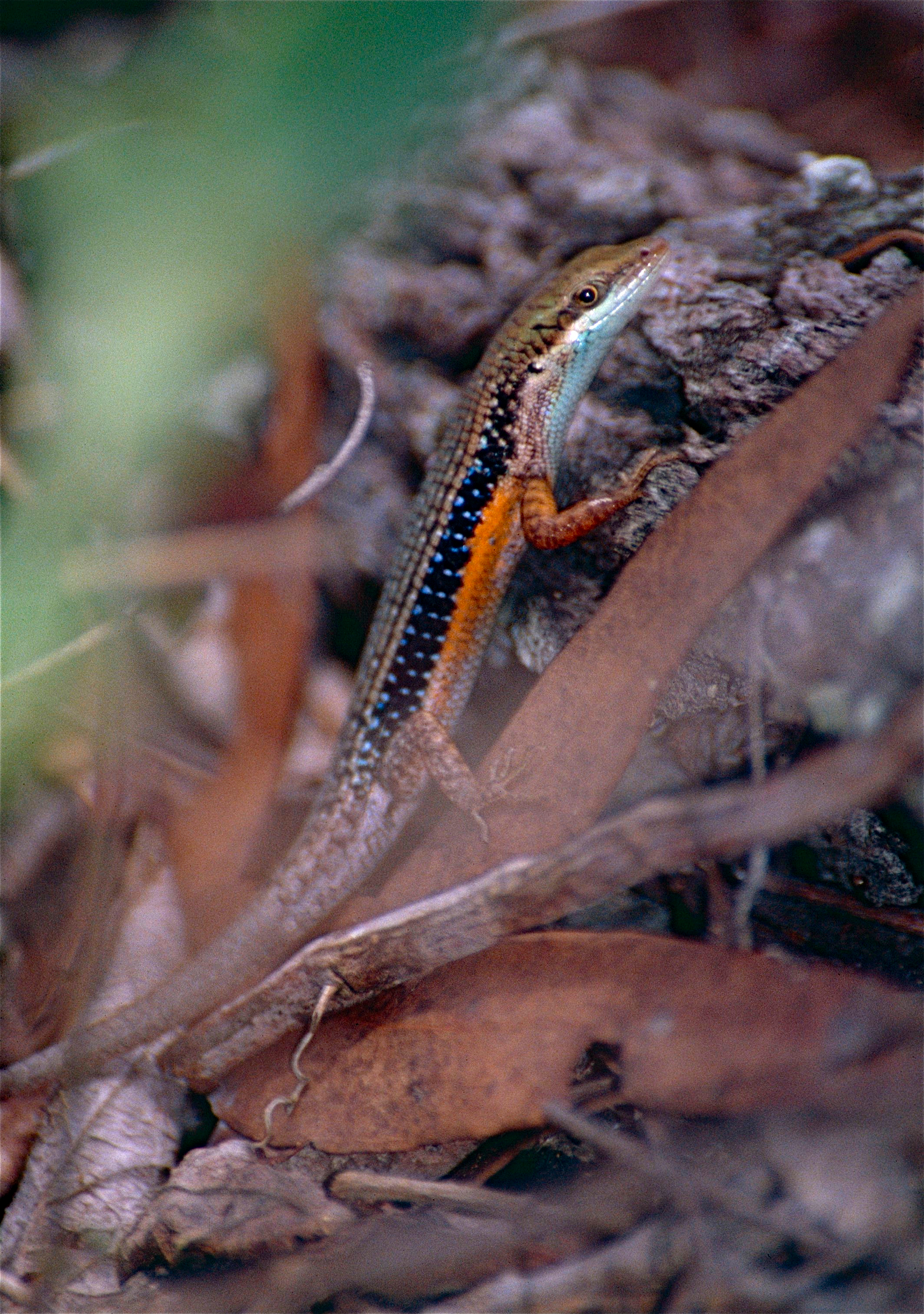

Conservation status
- Least Concern (IUCN 3.1)

Scientific classification
- Kingdom: Animalia
- Phylum: Chordata
- Class: Reptilia
- Order: Squamata
- Family: Scincidae
- Genus: Carlia
- Species: C. jarnoldae

Binomial name
- Carlia jarnoldae Covacevich & Ingram, 1975

= Carlia jarnoldae =

Species of lizard

Carlia jarnoldae, also known commonly as the lined rainbow-skink or the lined rainbow skink, is a species of lizard in the subfamily Eugongylinae of the family Scincidae. The species is endemic to the state of Queensland in Australia.

== Etymology ==
The specific name, jarnoldae, is in honor of Australian zoologist Jennifer "Jenny" Mary Arnold.

== Habitat ==
The preferred natural habitat of C. jarnoldae is rocky areas of forest and savanna.

== Description ==
C. jarnoldae may attain a snout-to-vent length (SVL) of almost 5 cm (2.0 in). Its dorsal scales are tricarinate (each with three keels). Dorsally, it has 5–7 black lines. The upper flanks are black, with small light blue spots. The lower flanks and the front legs are bright orange. There is a white lateral stripe which begins on the upper labials, and runs through the ear opening and along the neck.

== Reproduction ==
C. jarnoldae is oviparous.
