= Carlia munda =

Conservation status
- Least Concern (IUCN 3.1)

Scientific classification
- Kingdom: Animalia
- Phylum: Chordata
- Class: Reptilia
- Order: Squamata
- Suborder: Scinciformata
- Infraorder: Scincomorpha
- Family: Eugongylidae
- Genus: Carlia
- Species: C. munda

Binomial name
- Carlia munda (De Vis, 1885)

Species of lizard

Carlia munda, the shaded-litter rainbow-skink, is a species of skink in the genus Carlia. It is endemic to northern Australia.
