= Carlia beccarii =

Conservation status
- Least Concern (IUCN 3.1)

Scientific classification
- Kingdom: Animalia
- Phylum: Chordata
- Class: Reptilia
- Order: Squamata
- Family: Scincidae
- Subfamily: Eugongylinae
- Genus: Carlia
- Species: C. beccarii

Binomial name
- Carlia beccarii (W. Peters & Doria, 1878)

Synonyms
- Heteropus beccarii W. Peters & Doria, 1878; Lygosoma (Leiolopisma) becarrii [sic] — M.A. Smith, 1937; Carlia becarrii — Zug, 2004

Species of lizard

Carlia beccarii is a species of skink, a lizard in the subfamily Eugongylinae of the family Scincidae. The species is endemic to Indonesia.

== Etymology ==
The specific name, beccarii, is in honor of Italian botanist Odoardo Beccari.

== Description ==
Large for its genus, C. beccarii may attain a snout-to-vent length (SVL) of 8 cm (3.1 in). Males are larger than females, an example of sexual dimorphism. The average SVL of adult males is 7.2 cm (2.8 in), while the average SVL of adult females is 6.4 cm (2.5 in).

== Reproduction ==
C. beccarii is oviparous.
