= Carlia rubigo =

Conservation status
- Least Concern (IUCN 3.1)

Scientific classification
- Kingdom: Animalia
- Phylum: Chordata
- Class: Reptilia
- Order: Squamata
- Family: Scincidae
- Genus: Carlia
- Species: C. rubigo

Binomial name
- Carlia rubigo Hoskin & Couper, 2012

Species of lizard

Carlia rubigo, the orange-flanked rainbow-skink is a species of skink in the genus Carlia. It is endemic to Queensland, Australia.
