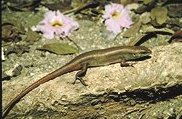

Conservation status
- Least Concern (IUCN 3.1)

Scientific classification
- Kingdom: Animalia
- Phylum: Chordata
- Class: Reptilia
- Order: Squamata
- Suborder: Scinciformata
- Infraorder: Scincomorpha
- Family: Eugongylidae
- Genus: Carlia
- Species: C. fusca

Binomial name
- Carlia fusca (A.M.C. Duméril & Bibron, 1839)

= Carlia fusca =

Species of lizard

Carlia fusca, the brown four-fingered skink or Indonesian brown skink, is a species of skink in the genus Carlia. It is endemic to Halmahera in Indonesia and Bismarck Archipelago in Papua New Guinea
