= Carlia aenigma =

Conservation status
- Least Concern (IUCN 3.1)

Scientific classification
- Kingdom: Animalia
- Phylum: Chordata
- Class: Reptilia
- Order: Squamata
- Family: Scincidae
- Genus: Carlia
- Species: C. aenigma

Binomial name
- Carlia aenigma Zug, 2004

Species of lizard

Carlia aenigma is a species of skink, commonly known as the enigmatic rainbow skink, in the genus Carlia. It is endemic to Papua New Guinea.
