= Carlia spinauris =

Scientific classification
- Kingdom: Animalia
- Phylum: Chordata
- Class: Reptilia
- Order: Squamata
- Family: Scincidae
- Genus: Carlia
- Species: C. spinauris

Binomial name
- Carlia spinauris (Smith, 1927)

Species of lizard

Carlia spinauris is a species of skink in the genus Carlia. It is native to Indonesia.
