= Carlia insularis =

Scientific classification
- Kingdom: Animalia
- Phylum: Chordata
- Class: Reptilia
- Order: Squamata
- Family: Scincidae
- Genus: Carlia
- Species: C. insularis

Binomial name
- Carlia insularis Afonso-Silva, Santos, Ogilvie, & Moritz, 2017

Species of skink

Carlia insularis, the Kimberley islands rainbow-skink, is a species of skink. It is endemic to the islands of the Bonaparte Archipelago in the Kimberley region of Western Australia. It measures 28–51 mm (1.1–2.0 in) in snout–vent length.
