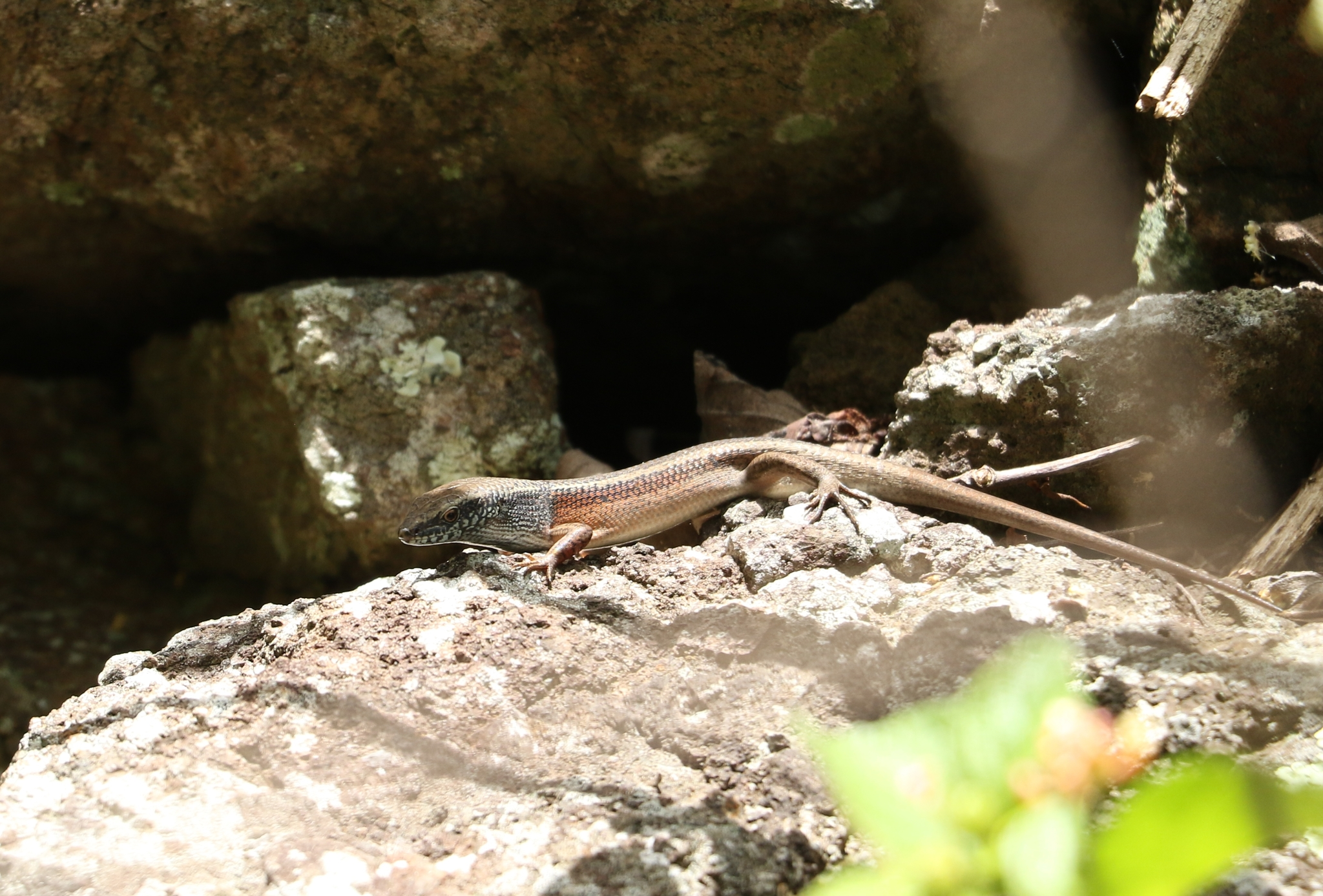

Conservation status
- Least Concern (IUCN 3.1)

Scientific classification
- Kingdom: Animalia
- Phylum: Chordata
- Class: Reptilia
- Order: Squamata
- Family: Scincidae
- Genus: Carlia
- Species: C. schmeltzii

Binomial name
- Carlia schmeltzii (W. Peters, 1867)

Synonyms
- Heteropus schmeltzii W. Peters, 1867; Carlia prava Covacevich & Ingram, 1975; Carlia schmeltzii — Cogger, 1983

= Carlia schmeltzii =

Species of lizard

Carlia schmeltzii, known commonly as the robust rainbow-skink, is a species of lizard in the family Scincidae. The species is endemic to Australia.

== Etymology ==
The specific name, schmeltzii, is in honor of German ethnographer Johannes Dietrich Eduard Schmeltz.

== Geographic range ==
Carlia schmeltzii is native to New South Wales and Queensland in eastern Australia.

== Habitat ==
The preferred natural habitats of C. schmeltzii are rocky areas, shrubland, savanna, and forest.

== Reproduction ==
Carlia schmeltzii is oviparous.
