= Carlia aramia =

Conservation status
- Least Concern (IUCN 3.1)

Scientific classification
- Kingdom: Animalia
- Phylum: Chordata
- Class: Reptilia
- Order: Squamata
- Family: Scincidae
- Genus: Carlia
- Species: C. aramia

Binomial name
- Carlia aramia Zug, 2004

Species of lizard

Carlia aramia is a species of skink, commonly known as the Aramia rainbow skink, in the genus Carlia. It is endemic to Papua New Guinea.
