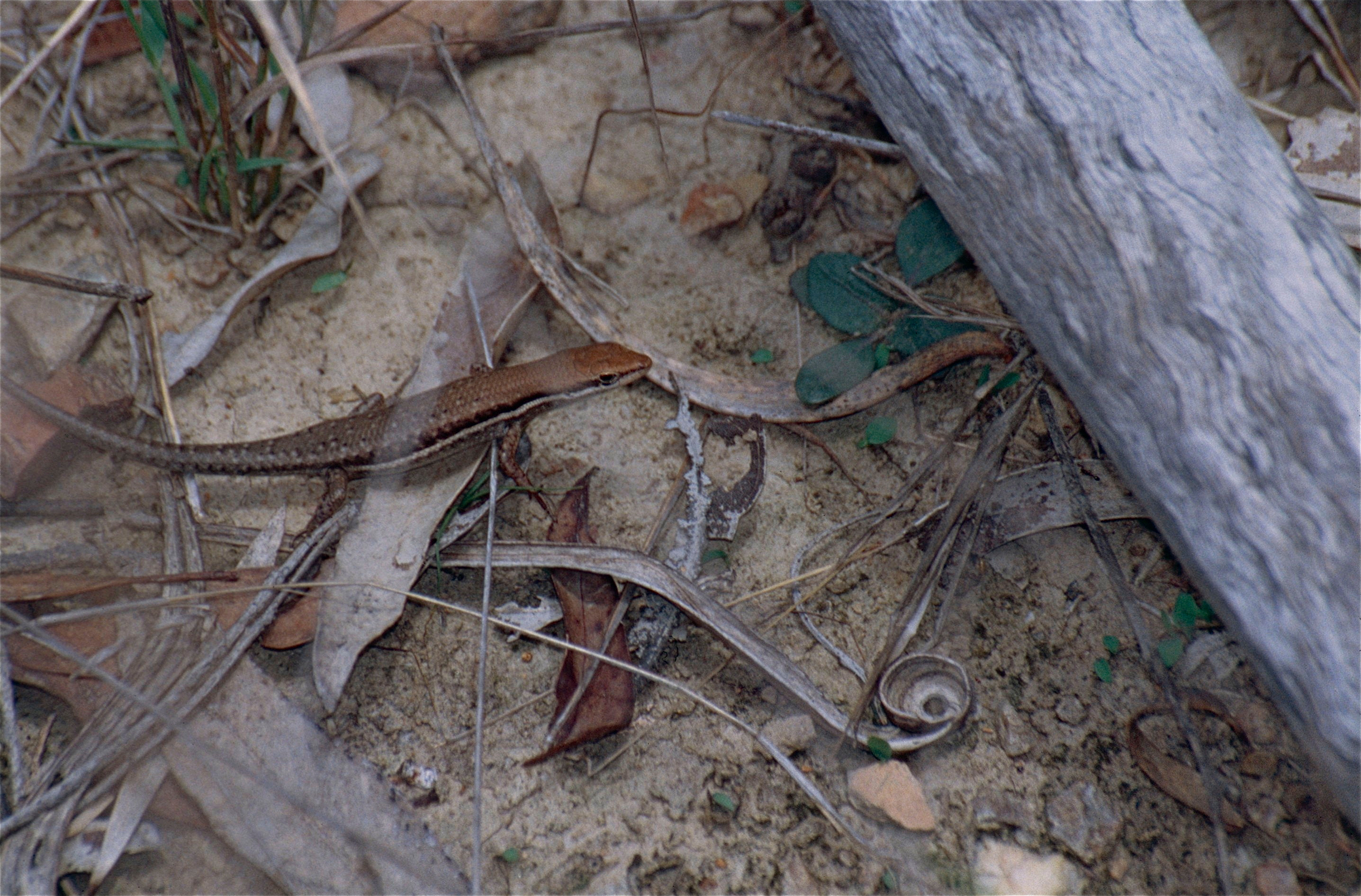

Conservation status
- Least Concern (IUCN 3.1)

Scientific classification
- Kingdom: Animalia
- Phylum: Chordata
- Class: Reptilia
- Order: Squamata
- Suborder: Scinciformata
- Infraorder: Scincomorpha
- Family: Eugongylidae
- Genus: Carlia
- Species: C. dogare

Binomial name
- Carlia dogare Covacevich & Ingram, 1975
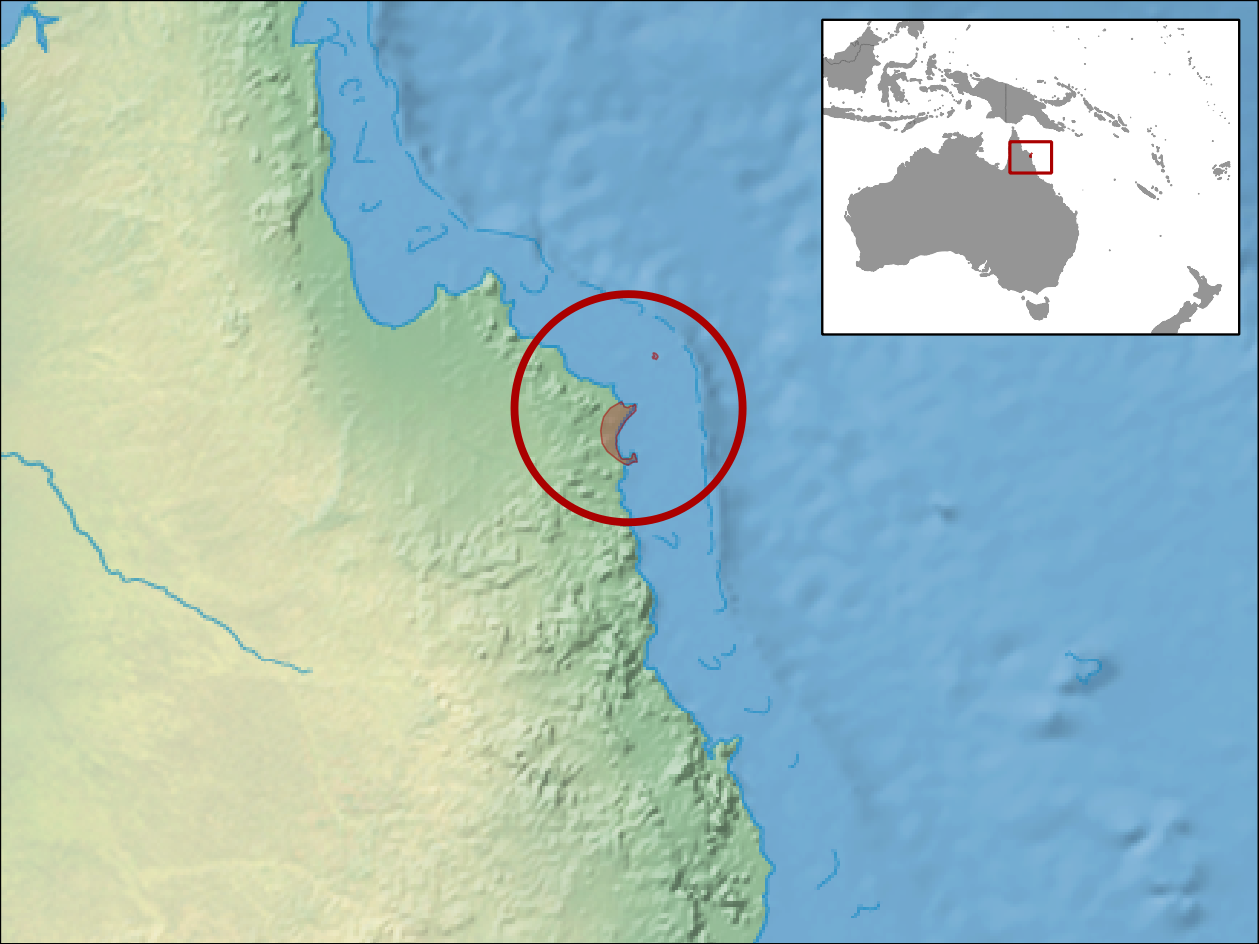

= Carlia dogare =

Species of lizard

Carlia dogare, the sandy rainbow skink, is a species of skink in the genus Carlia. It is native to Queensland in Australia.
