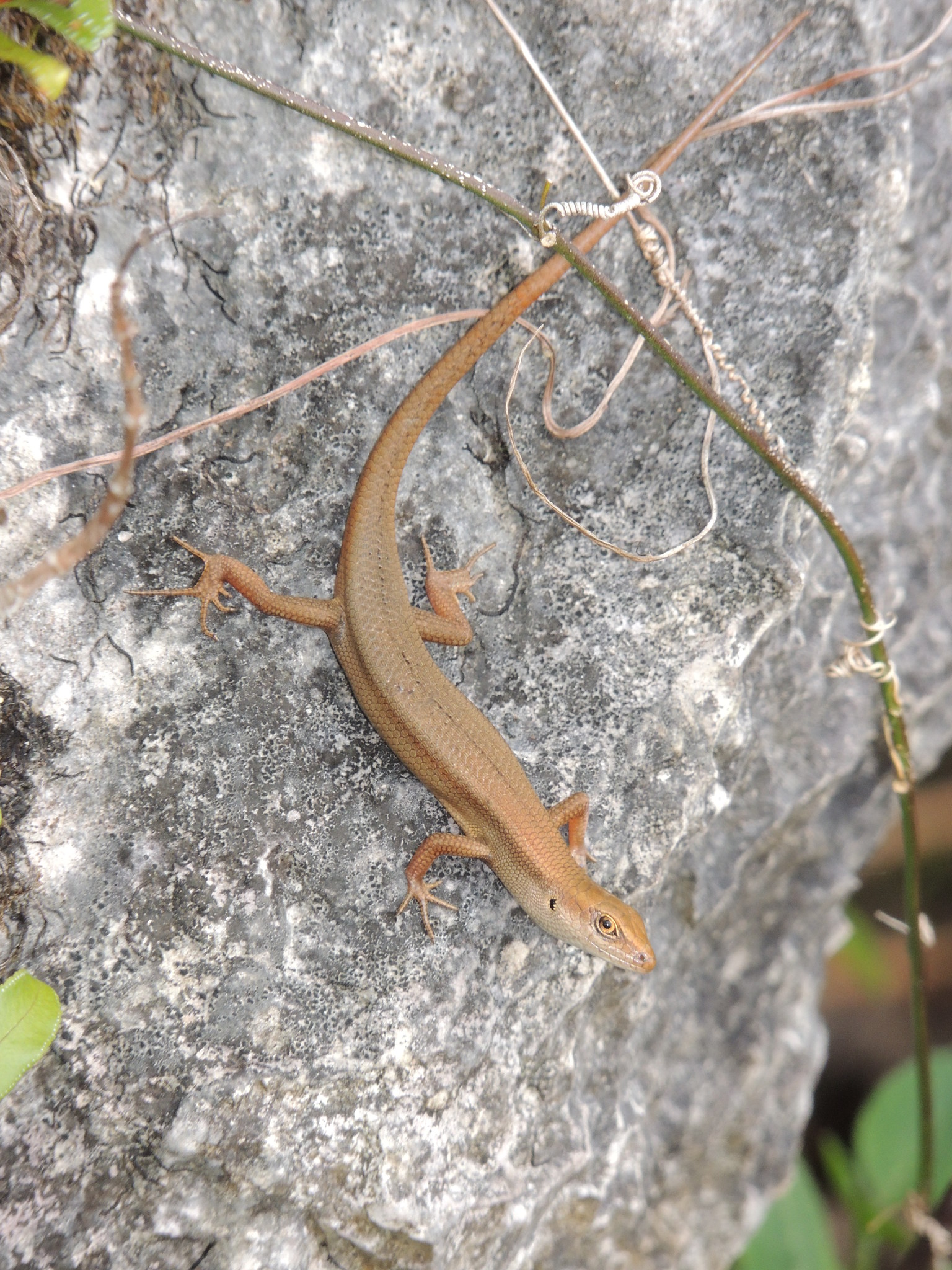

Conservation status
- Least Concern (IUCN 3.1)

Scientific classification
- Kingdom: Animalia
- Phylum: Chordata
- Class: Reptilia
- Order: Squamata
- Family: Scincidae
- Genus: Carlia
- Species: C. ailanpalai

Binomial name
- Carlia ailanpalai Zug, 2004

= Carlia ailanpalai =

Species of lizard

Carlia ailanpalai is a species of skink, commonly known as the curious skink, in the genus Carlia. It is native to Papua New Guinea. It has been introduced to Weno Island and Guam.
