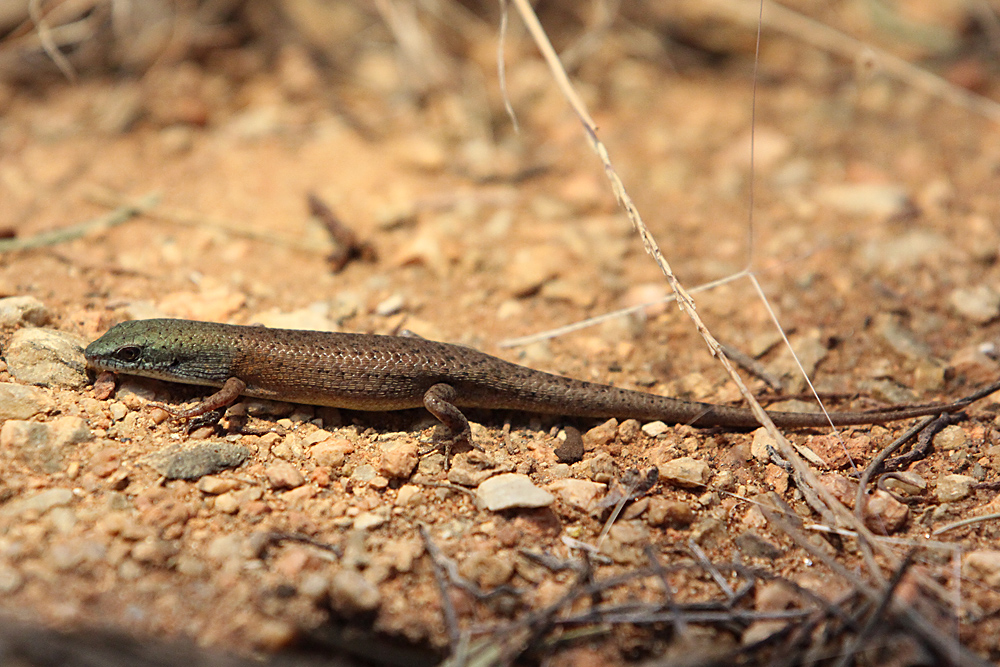
- Male

Conservation status
- Least Concern (IUCN 3.1)

Scientific classification
- Kingdom: Animalia
- Phylum: Chordata
- Class: Reptilia
- Order: Squamata
- Suborder: Scinciformata
- Infraorder: Scincomorpha
- Family: Eugongylidae
- Genus: Carlia
- Species: C. triacantha

Binomial name
- Carlia triacantha (F. J. Mitchell, 1953)
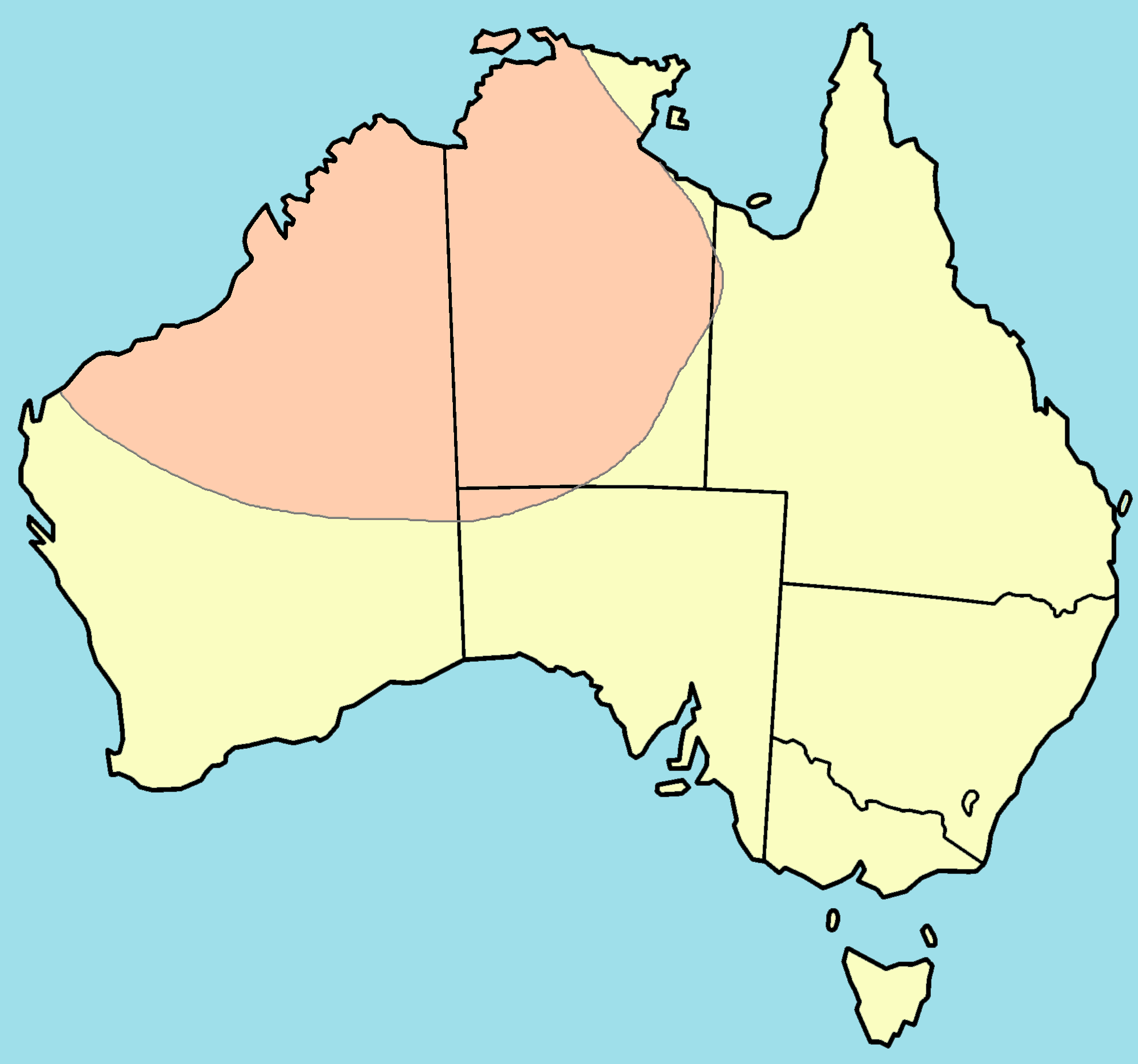

= Desert rainbow-skink =

Species of lizard

The desert rainbow-skink (Carlia triacantha) is an Australian skink in the genus Carlia, commonly known as four-fingered skinks, from the subfamily Lygosominae. It is native to desert woodland regions throughout most of the Northern Territory, the north of Western Australia, and the far north-west of South Australia. It was originally classified as Leiolopisma triacantha, and is sometimes known as the three-spined rainbow-skink.

== Description ==
The desert rainbow-skink is on average 5.3 centimetres (2.1 in) long, excluding the tail. It is characterised by three keels or spines on the dorsal scales. It is typically a mid-brown to grey-brown colour with less pigmentation on the ventral surface, but males display extra colouration, particularly during breeding season.

Desert rainbow-skinks shelter in woodland leaf litter, feeding mainly on invertebrates. Their large eyes help them to see their prey in the dim lighting of the leaf litter, and the eyes are covered by an eyelid with a transparent window that protects the eye while burrowing in the litter.

== Reproduction ==
The desert rainbow-skink is an egg-laying or oviparous reptile. It has an average clutch size of two eggs. During breeding season males of the species display blue-green colouring on the head and red flanks.
