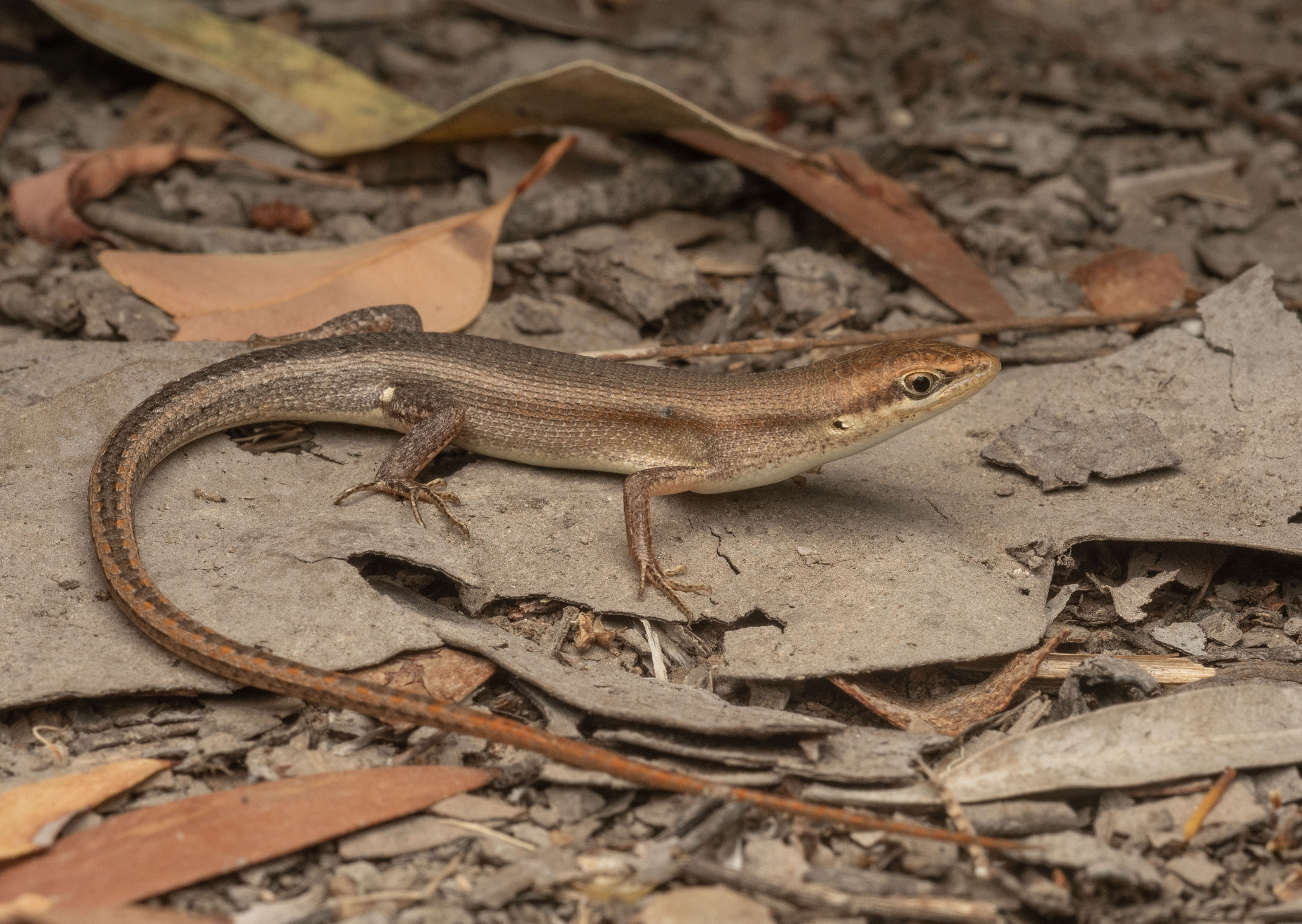

Conservation status
- Least Concern (IUCN 3.1)
- Least Concern (NCA)

Scientific classification
- Kingdom: Animalia
- Phylum: Chordata
- Class: Reptilia
- Order: Squamata
- Family: Scincidae
- Genus: Carlia
- Species: C. storri

Binomial name
- Carlia storri Ingram & Covacevich, 1989

= Carlia storri =

Species of lizard

Carlia storri, also known commonly as the brown bicarinate rainbow-skink or Storr's carlia, is a species of lizard in the family Scincidae. The species was first described by Glen Joseph Ingram and Jeanette Covacevich in 1989. It is native to Papua New Guinea and the Australian state of Queensland.

== Etymology ==
The specific name, storri, is in honour of Australian herpetologist Glen Milton Storr.

== Habitat ==
The preferred natural habitats of C. storri are the supralittoral zone, shrubland, savanna, and forest, at altitudes from sea level to 200 m (660 ft).

== Reproduction ==
Carlia storri usually have two clutches of eggs per year, with two eggs per clutch.
