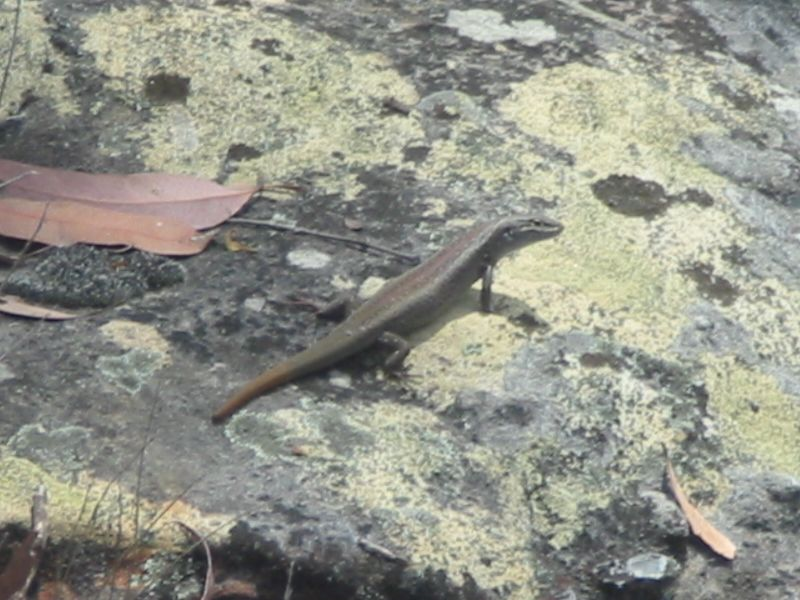

Conservation status
- Least Concern (IUCN 3.1)

Scientific classification
- Kingdom: Animalia
- Phylum: Chordata
- Class: Reptilia
- Order: Squamata
- Family: Scincidae
- Genus: Carlia
- Species: C. tetradactyla

Binomial name
- Carlia tetradactyla (O'Shaughnessy, 1879)
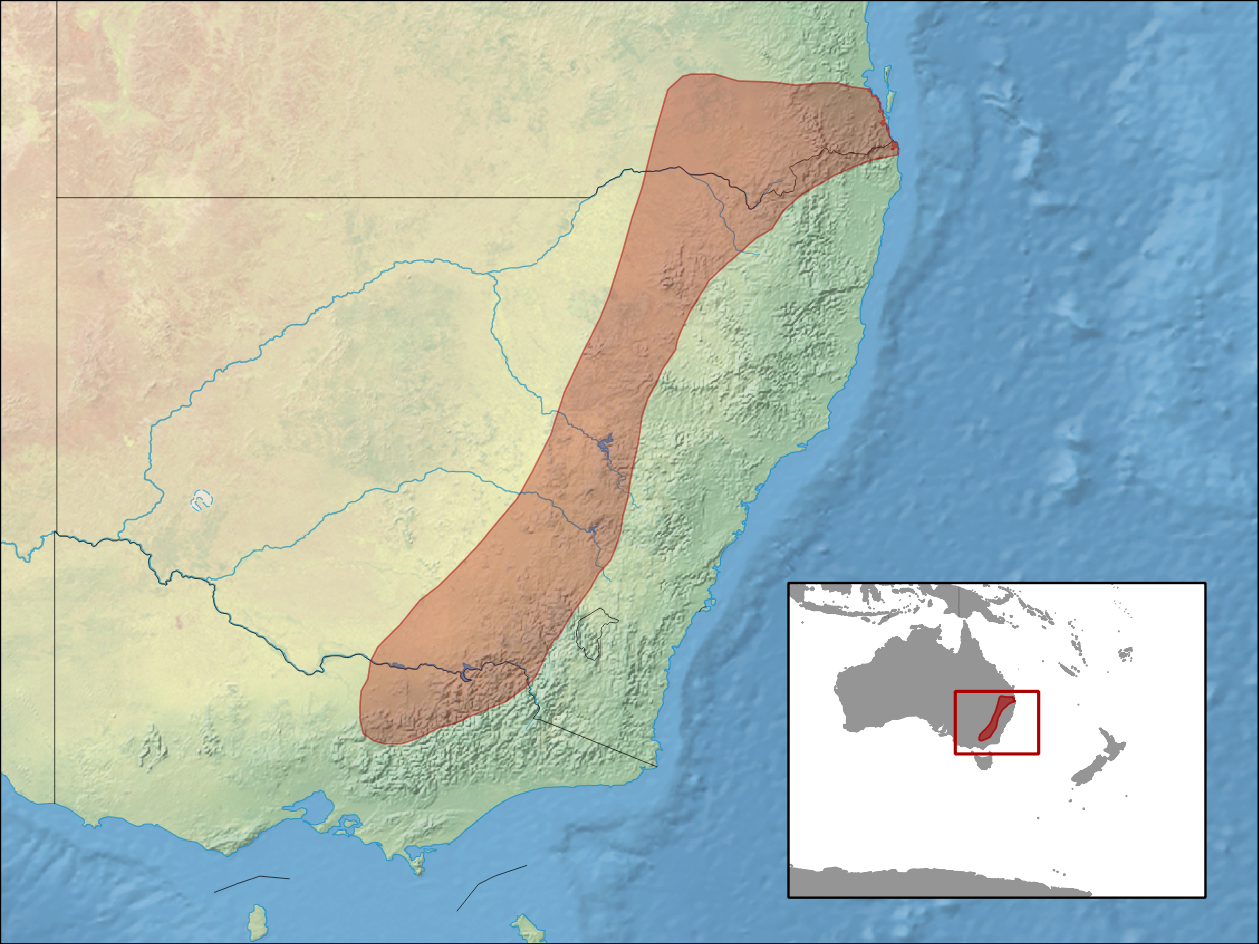

= Carlia tetradactyla =

Species of lizard

Carlia tetradactyla, the southern rainbow-skink, is a small species of colourful lizard found in Australia.

A synonym for the species is Mocoa tetradactyla, published with a description by A. W. E. O'Shaughnessy in 1879.

Its distribution range includes the states of Victoria, New South Wales, and Queensland. The type locality is labelled as Queensland, but this is uncertain.
