= Carlia quinquecarinata =

Conservation status
- Data Deficient (IUCN 3.1)

Scientific classification
- Kingdom: Animalia
- Phylum: Chordata
- Class: Reptilia
- Order: Squamata
- Suborder: Scinciformata
- Infraorder: Scincomorpha
- Family: Eugongylidae
- Genus: Carlia
- Species: C. quinquecarinata

Binomial name
- Carlia quinquecarinata Macleay, 1877

Species of lizard

Carlia quinquecarinata is a species of skink, commonly known as the five-keeled rainbow-skink or five-carinated rainbow-skink, in the genus Carlia. It is endemic to Darnley Island in Australia.
