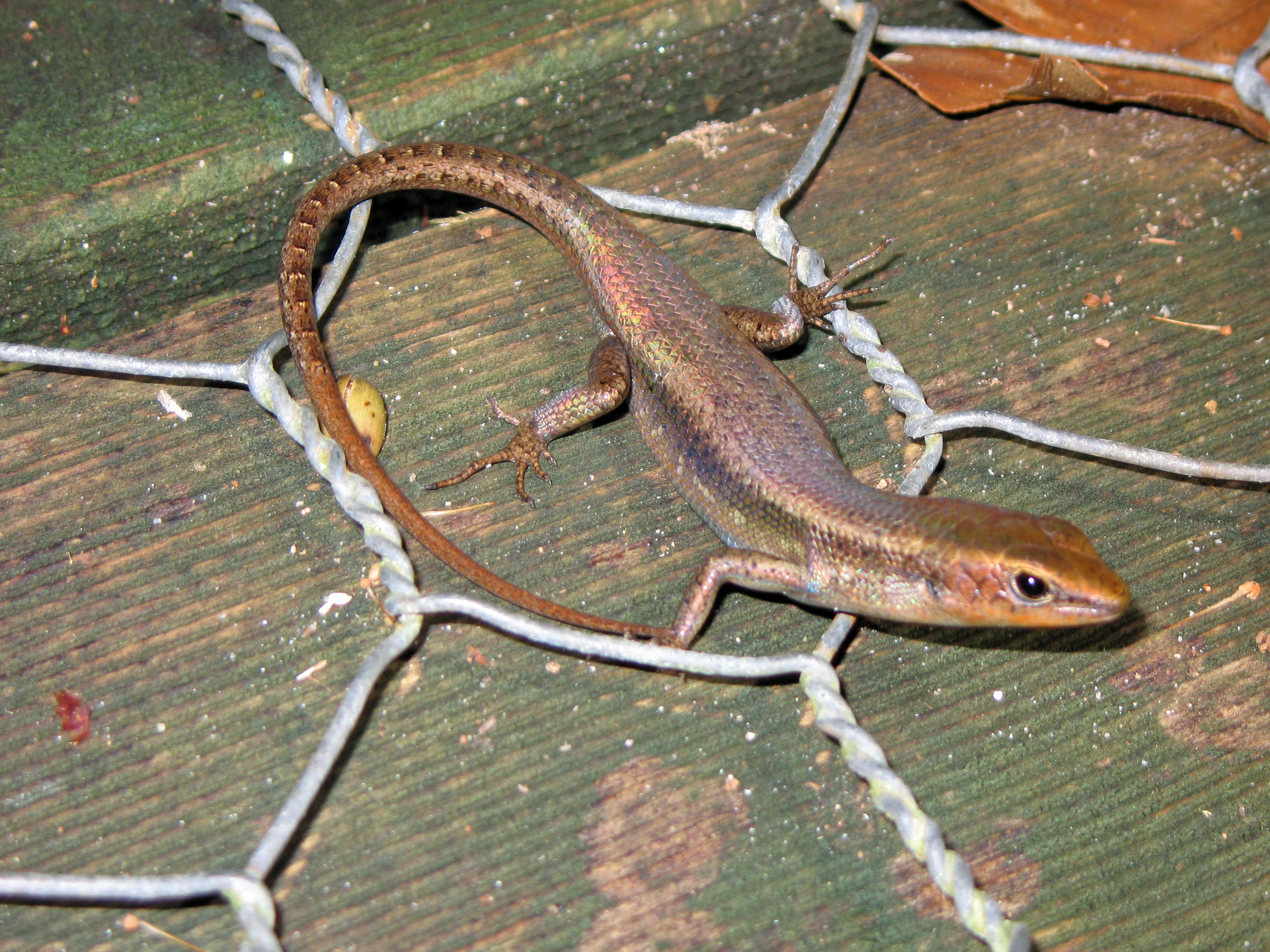
- Carlia rubrigularis

Scientific classification
- Kingdom: Animalia
- Phylum: Chordata
- Class: Reptilia
- Order: Squamata
- Family: Scincidae
- Subfamily: Eugongylinae
- Genus: Carlia; Gray, 1845

= Carlia =

Genus of lizards

Carlia is a genus of lizards, commonly known as four-fingered skinks or rainbow skinks, in the subfamily Eugongylinae of the family Scincidae. Before being placed in this new subfamily, Carlia was recovered in a clade with the genera Niveoscincus, Lampropholis, and others of the Eugongylus group within Lygosominae.

== Species ==
The genus Carlia contains the following species (n.b., a binomial authority in parentheses indicates that the species was originally described in a genus other than Carlia):

- Carlia aenigma (Zug, 2004) – enigmatic rainbow skink
- Carlia ailanpalai (Zug, 2004) – curious skink
- Carlia amax (Storr, 1974) – bauxite rainbow-skink
- Carlia aramia (Zug, 2004) – Aramia rainbow skink
- Carlia babarensis (Kopstein, 1926)
- Carlia beccarii (W. Peters & Doria, 1878)
- Carlia bicarinata (Macleay, 1877) – rainbow-skink
- Carlia bomberai (Zug & Allison, 2006)
- Carlia caesius (Zug & Allison, 2006)
- Carlia crypta Singhal, Hoskin, Couper, Potter & Moritz, 2018
- Carlia decora Hoskin & Couper, 2012 – elegant rainbow-skink
- Carlia diguliensis (Kopstein, 1926) – Digul River rainbow skink
- Carlia dogare (Covacevich & Ingram, 1975) – sandy rainbow-skink
- Carlia eothen (Zug, 2004)
- Carlia fusca (A.M.C. Duméril & Bibron, 1839) – brown four-fingered skink, Indonesian brown skink
- Carlia gracilis (Storr, 1974) – slender rainbow-skink
- Carlia inconnexa Ingram & Covacevich, 1989 – Whitsunday rainbow-skink
- Carlia insularis Afonso-Silva, Santos, Ogilvie & Moritz, 2017 – Kimberley islands rainbow-skink
- Carlia isostriacantha Afonso-Silva, Santos, Ogilvie & Moritz, 2017 – Monsoonal three-keeled rainbow-skink
- Carlia jarnoldae (Covacevich & Ingram, 1975) – lined rainbow-skink
- Carlia johnstonei (Storr, 1974) – rough brown rainbow-skink
- Carlia leucotaenia (Bleeker, 1860)
- Carlia longipes (Macleay, 1877) – closed-litter rainbow-skink
- Carlia luctuosa (W. Peters & Doria, 1878)
- Carlia munda (De Vis, 1885) – shaded-litter rainbow-skink
- Carlia mysi (Zug, 2004) – Mys's rainbow skink
- Carlia nigrauris (Zug, 2010)
- Carlia pectoralis (De Vis, 1885) – open-litter rainbow-skink
- Carlia peronii (A.M.C. Duméril & Bibron, 1839)
- Carlia pulla (T. Barbour, 1911)
- Carlia quinquecarinata (Macleay, 1877) – five-keeled rainbow-skink, five-carinated rainbow-skink
- Carlia rhomboidalis (W. Peters, 1869) – blue-throated rainbow-skink
- Carlia rostralis (De Vis, 1885) – black-throated rainbow-skink, hooded rainbow skink
- Carlia rubigo Hoskin & Couper, 2012 – orange-flanked rainbow-skink
- Carlia rubrigularis (Ingram & Covacevich, 1989) – red-throated rainbow-skink, northern red-throated skink
- Carlia rufilatus (Storr, 1974) – red-sided rainbow-skink
- Carlia schmeltzii (W. Peters, 1867) – robust rainbow-skink, Schmeltz's skink
- Carlia sexdentata (Macleay, 1877) – six-toothed rainbow-skink
- Carlia spinauris (Smith, 1927)
- Carlia storri (Ingram & Covacevich, 1989) – brown bicarinate rainbow-skink
- Carlia sukur Zug & Kaiser, 2014 – Sukur four-toed skink
- Carlia tetradactyla (O'Shaughnessy, 1879) – southern rainbow-skink
- Carlia triacantha (Mitchell, 1953) – desert rainbow-skink
- Carlia tutela (Zug, 2004)
- Carlia vivax (De Vis, 1884) – lively rainbow-skink, tussock rainbow-skink
- Carlia wundalthini (Hoskin, 2014) – Cape Melville rainbow skink

== See also ==
- Carlina (name)
