= Carlia caesius =

Conservation status
- Least Concern (IUCN 3.1)

Scientific classification
- Kingdom: Animalia
- Phylum: Chordata
- Class: Reptilia
- Order: Squamata
- Family: Scincidae
- Genus: Carlia
- Species: C. caesius

Binomial name
- Carlia caesius (Zug & Allison, 2006)

Species of lizard

Carlia caesius is a species of skink in the genus Carlia. It is endemic to Irian Jaya in Indonesia.
