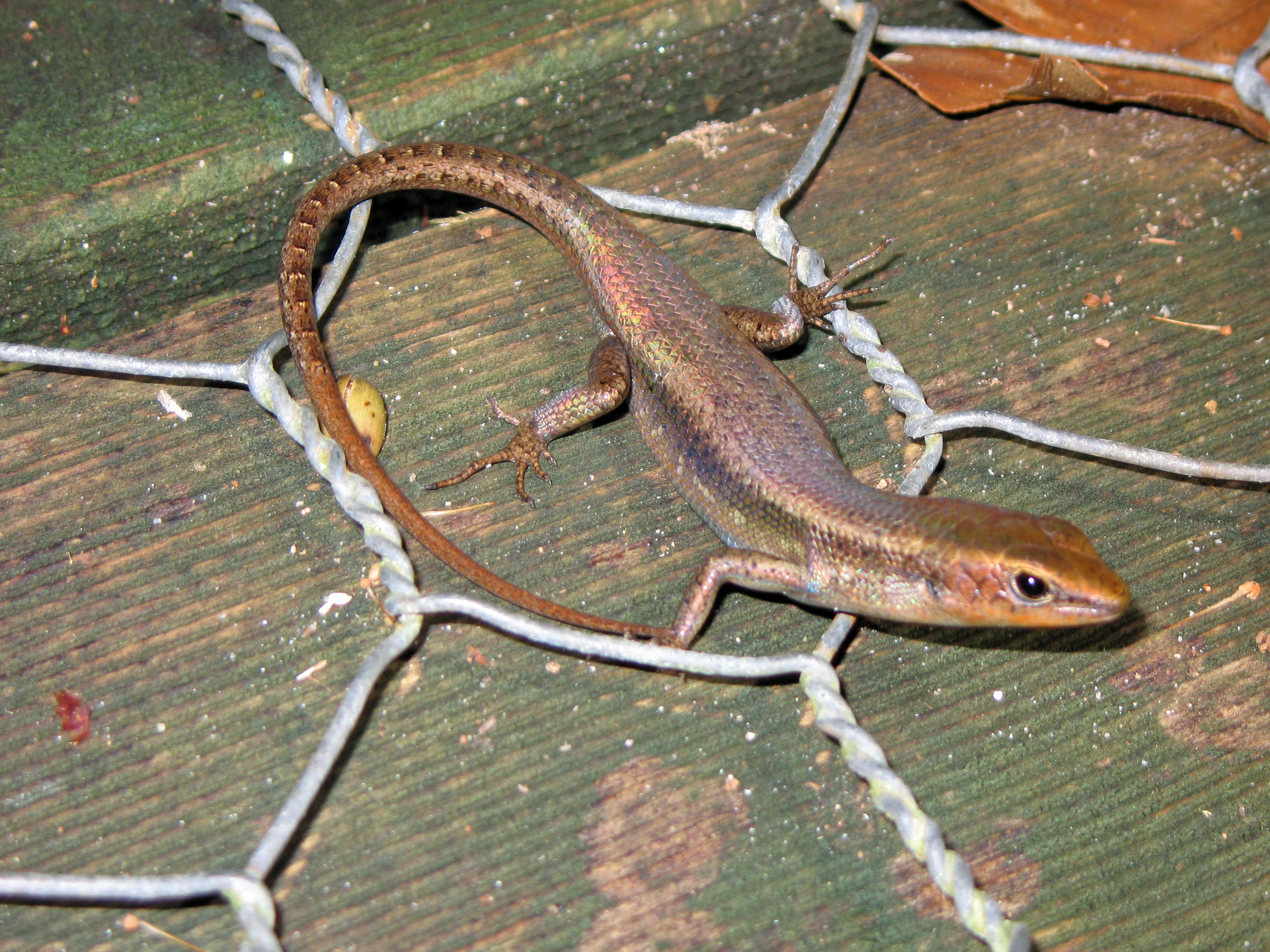

Conservation status
- Least Concern (IUCN 3.1)

Scientific classification
- Kingdom: Animalia
- Phylum: Chordata
- Class: Reptilia
- Order: Squamata
- Suborder: Scinciformata
- Infraorder: Scincomorpha
- Family: Eugongylidae
- Genus: Carlia
- Species: C. rubrigularis

Binomial name
- Carlia rubrigularis Ingram & Covacevich, 1989
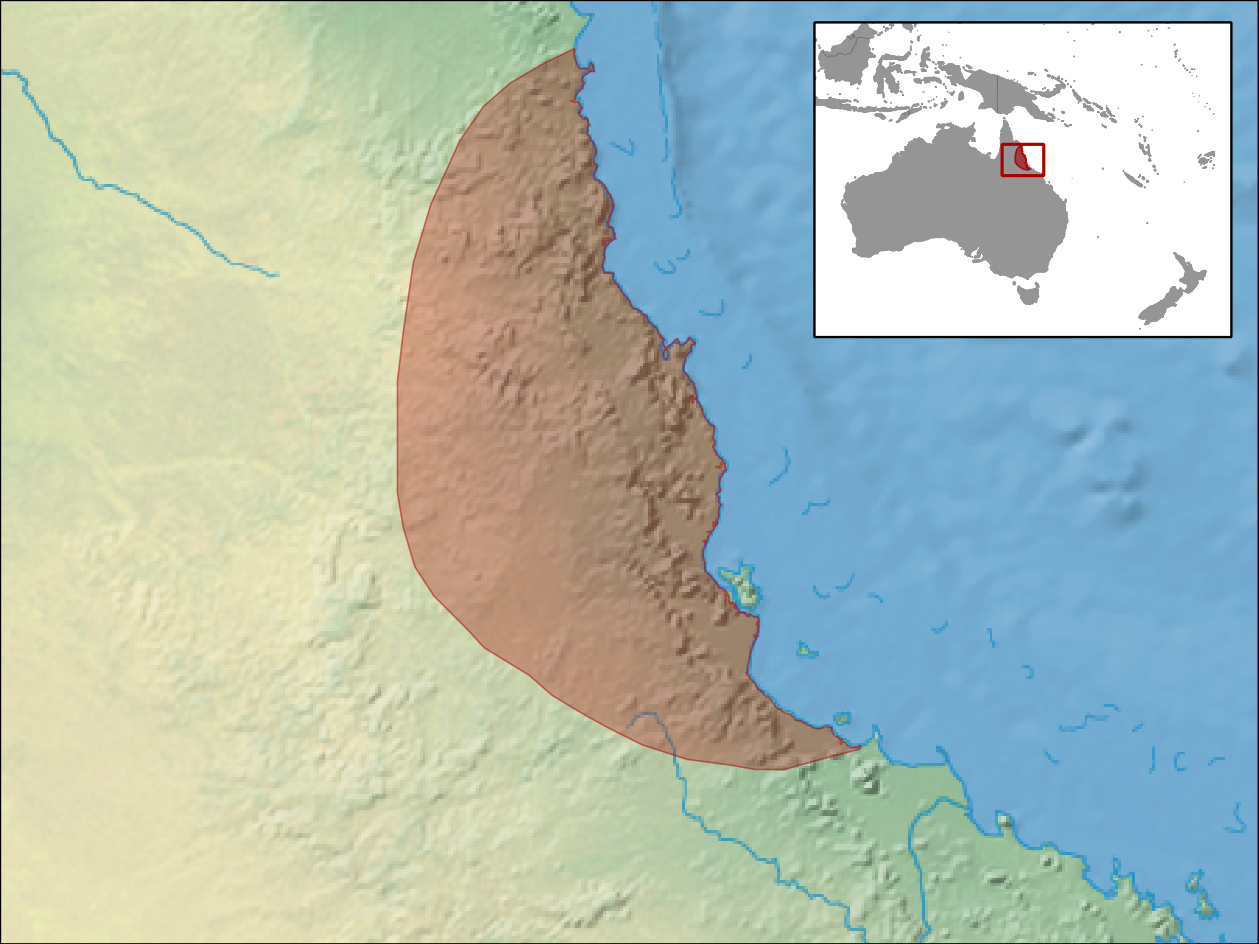

= Carlia rubrigularis =

Species of lizard

Carlia rubrigularis, the red-throated rainbow-skink or the northern red-throated skink is a species of skink in the genus Carlia. It is endemic to Queensland, Australia.

C. rubrigularis, provides an example of sexual dimorphism. Males display red throat coloration, while females exhibit pale pink. Throat coloration in males has been observed to become exaggerated during breeding season.

The reproduction period for female C. rubrigularis occurs from July-April.
