= Carlia leucotaenia =

Conservation status
- Least Concern (IUCN 3.1)

Scientific classification
- Kingdom: Animalia
- Phylum: Chordata
- Class: Reptilia
- Order: Squamata
- Family: Scincidae
- Genus: Carlia
- Species: C. leucotaenia

Binomial name
- Carlia leucotaenia (Bleeker, 1860)

Synonyms
- Heteropus leucotaenia Bleeker, 1860; Heteropus Schlegelii Peters, 1864

Species of lizard

Carlia leucotaenia is a species of skink in the subfamily Eugongylinae. It is endemic to the Maluku Islands (=Moluccas) of Indonesia, specifically Seram and Ambon Islands.

== Description ==
Males measure 43–53 mm (1.7–2.1 in) and females 39–52 mm (1.5–2.0 in) in snout–vent length. It is oviparous.
