= Carlia peronii =

Conservation status
- Least Concern (IUCN 3.1)

Scientific classification
- Kingdom: Animalia
- Phylum: Chordata
- Class: Reptilia
- Order: Squamata
- Family: Scincidae
- Genus: Carlia
- Species: C. peronii

Binomial name
- Carlia peronii (A.M.C. Duméril & Bibron, 1839)

Synonyms
- Heteropus peronii A.M.C. Dumril & Bibron, 1839

Species of lizard

Carlia peronii is a species of lizard in the subfamily Eugongylinae of the family Scincidae (skinks). The species is native to Timor in Indonesia.

== Etymology ==
The specific name, peronii, is in honor of François Péron, a French naturalist and explorer.

== Habitat ==
The preferred natural habitats of Carlia peronii are forest and savanna, but it has also been found in villages.

== Behavior ==
Carlia peronii is terrestrial.

== Reproduction ==
Carlia peronii is oviparous.
