= Carlia isostriacantha =

Scientific classification
- Kingdom: Animalia
- Phylum: Chordata
- Class: Reptilia
- Order: Squamata
- Family: Scincidae
- Genus: Carlia
- Species: C. isostriacantha

Binomial name
- Carlia isostriacantha Afonso-Silva, Santos, Ogilvie, & Moritz, 2017

Species of lizard

Carlia isostriacantha, the Monsoonal three-keeled rainbow-skink, is a species of skink. It is endemic to Australia; most records are from the Kimberley region in Western Australia, but there are also some records from the border area between the Northern Territory and Queensland. It measures 25–49 mm (1.0–1.9 in) in snout–vent length.
