= Carlia mysi =

Conservation status
- Least Concern (IUCN 3.1)

Scientific classification
- Kingdom: Animalia
- Phylum: Chordata
- Class: Reptilia
- Order: Squamata
- Family: Scincidae
- Genus: Carlia
- Species: C. mysi

Binomial name
- Carlia mysi Zug, 2004

Species of lizard

Carlia mysi, commonly known as Mys' rainbow skink, is a species of lizard in the subfamily Eugongylinae of the family Scincidae. The species is native to Papua New Guinea.

== Etymology ==
The specific name, mysi, is in honor of Belgian herpetologist Benoit Mys.

== Geographic distribution ==
Carlia mysi occurs in both mainland New Guinea and in the Bismarck Archipelago. Populations believed to be introduced exist in the Solomon Islands.

== Habitat ==
The preferred natural habitat of Carlia mysi is grassland, at elevations from sea level to 500 m (1,600 ft), but it has also been found in disturbed and urban areas.

== Reproduction ==
Carlia mysi is oviparous.
