= Carlia diguliensis =

Digul River rainbow skink

Conservation status
- Least Concern (IUCN 3.1)

Scientific classification
- Kingdom: Animalia
- Phylum: Chordata
- Class: Reptilia
- Order: Squamata
- Family: Scincidae
- Genus: Carlia
- Species: C. diguliensis

Binomial name
- Carlia diguliensis (Kopstein, 1926)

Species of lizard

Carlia diguliensis, the Digul River rainbow skink, is a species of skink in the genus Carlia. It is endemic to Papua New Guinea.
