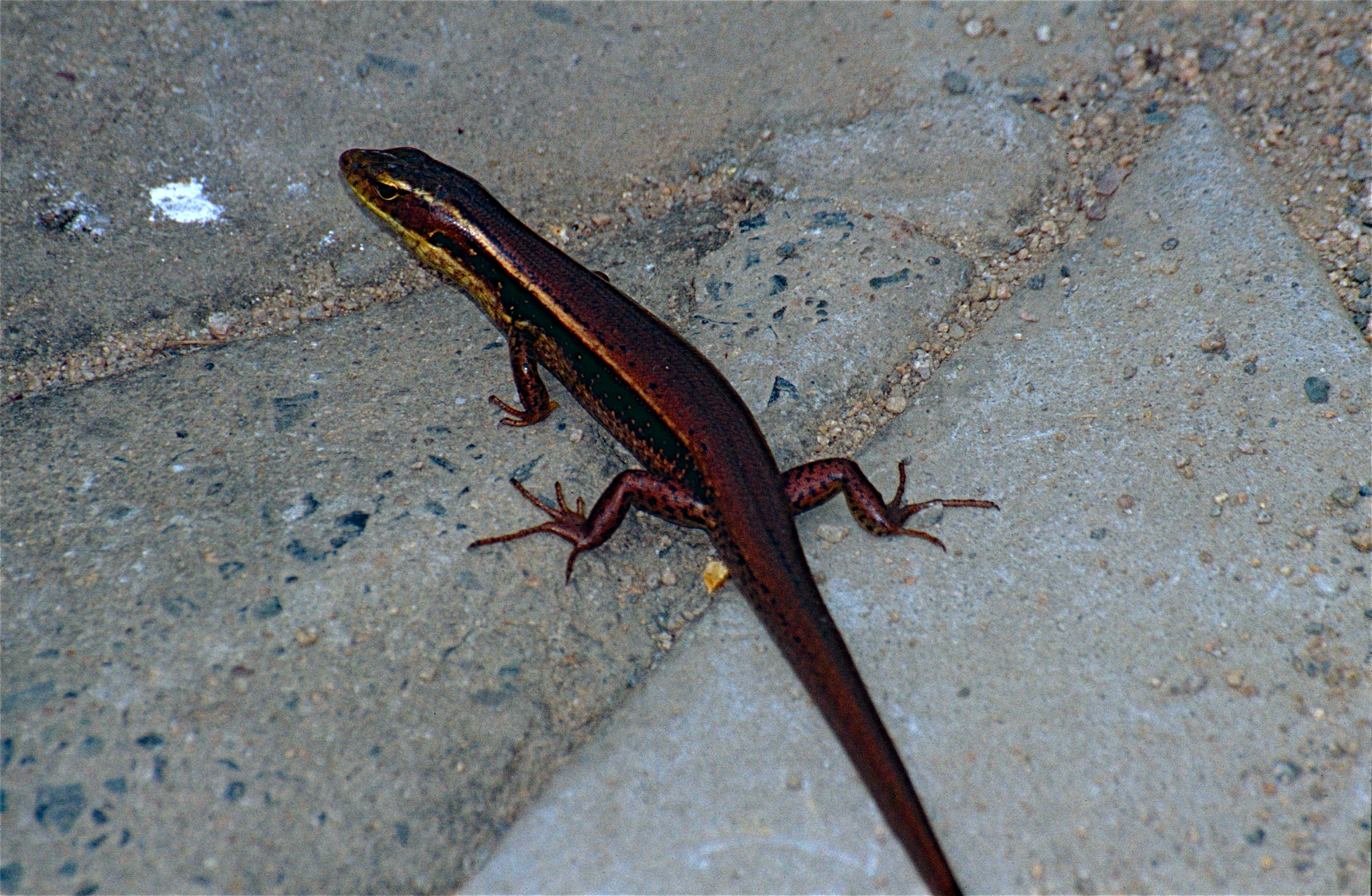

Conservation status
- Least Concern (IUCN 3.1)

Scientific classification
- Kingdom: Animalia
- Phylum: Chordata
- Class: Reptilia
- Order: Squamata
- Suborder: Scinciformata
- Infraorder: Scincomorpha
- Family: Eugongylidae
- Genus: Carlia
- Species: C. vivax

Binomial name
- Carlia vivax (De Vis, 1884)

= Carlia vivax =

Species of lizard

Carlia vivax, the lively rainbow-skink or tussock rainbow-skink, is a species of skink in the genus Carlia. It is endemic to New South Wales and Queensland in Australia.
