= Carlia wundalthini =

Conservation status
- Vulnerable (IUCN 3.1)

Scientific classification
- Kingdom: Animalia
- Phylum: Chordata
- Class: Reptilia
- Order: Squamata
- Family: Scincidae
- Genus: Carlia
- Species: C. wundalthini

Binomial name
- Carlia wundalthini Hoskin, 2014

Species of reptile

Carlia wundalthini, the Cape Melville rainbow-skink is a species of skink in the genus Carlia. It is endemic to Cape Melville National Park in Queensland in Australia.
