= Carlia tutela =

Conservation status
- Least Concern (IUCN 3.1)

Scientific classification
- Kingdom: Animalia
- Phylum: Chordata
- Class: Reptilia
- Order: Squamata
- Family: Scincidae
- Genus: Carlia
- Species: C. tutela

Binomial name
- Carlia tutela Zug, 2004

Species of lizard

Carlia tutela is a species of skink in the genus Carlia. It is endemic to Indonesia.
