= François Péron =

French naturalist and explorer (1775–1810)

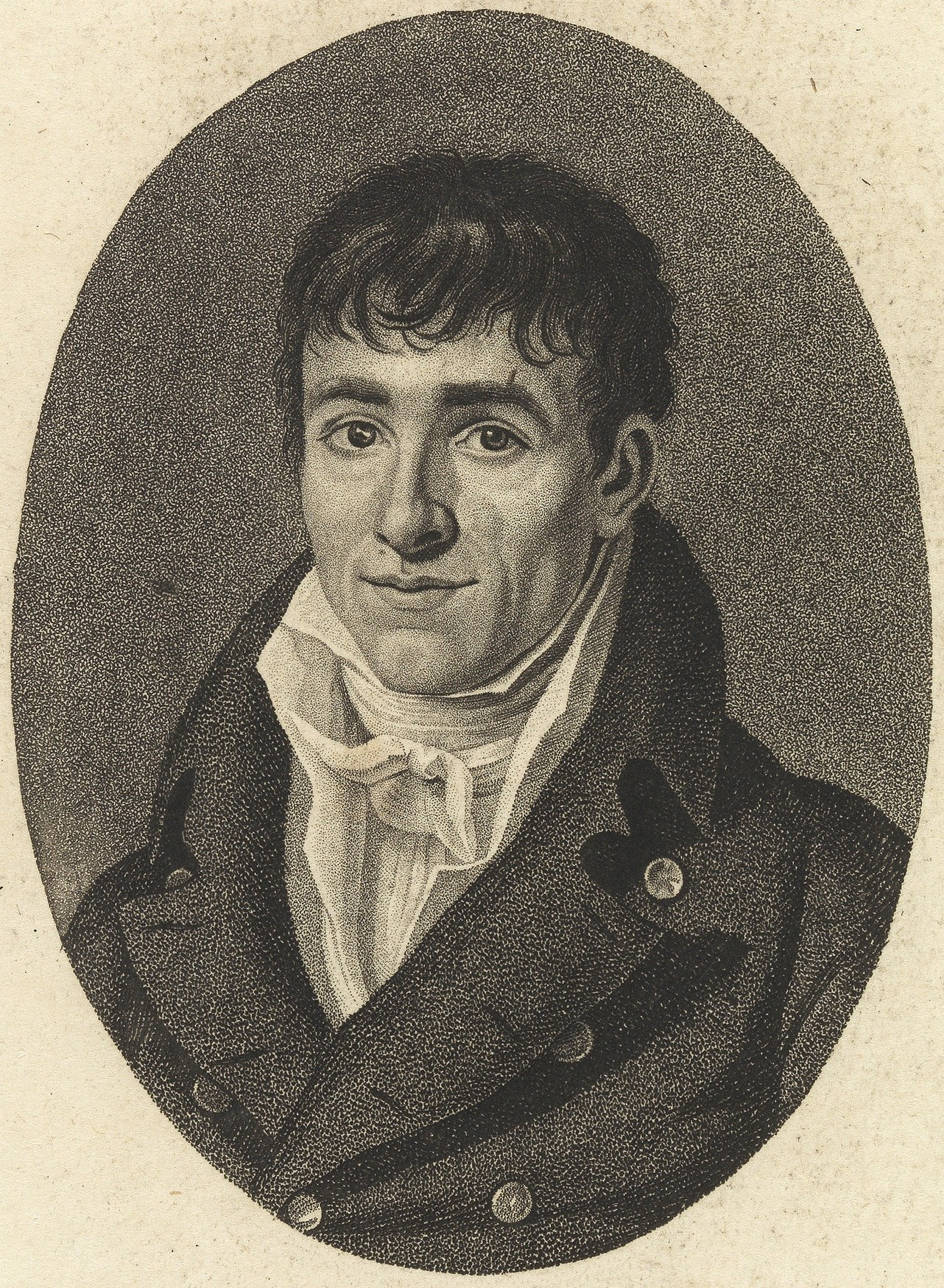
- François Péron
- Born: François Auguste Péron; 23 August 1775; Cérilly, France
- Died: 14 December 1810 (aged 35); Cérilly, France
- Known for: Naturalist who explored Australia in the early 19th century; namesake of Peron Peninsula and Francois Peron National Park

François Auguste Péron (French pronunciation: [fʁɑ̃swa peʁɔ̃]; 22 August 1775 – 14 December 1810) was a French naturalist and explorer. Péron explored Australia and documented anthropology, oceanography, meteorology and zoology on board of Nicolas Baudin's 1801 and 1803 expeditions.

== Life ==
Péron was born in Cérilly, Allier, in 1775, the son of a tailor (not a harness maker as is frequently asserted). Although intended for the priesthood, due to the Revolution Péron reluctantly joined the 2nd Allier Volunteer Battalion in 1792 and helped defend besieged Landau. In the following year he was wounded and taken prisoner by Prussian forces near Hochspeyer in the Pfälzerwald. Imprisoned in the fortress of Magdeburg, he was not repatriated to France until 1794. Having lost the sight of an eye, Péron was invalided out of the army. For two years he was town clerk in Cérilly before gaining a scholarship to study medicine in Paris. While in Paris, Péron changed interests towards zoology, spending time at the Muséum d'histoire naturelle. In 1800, after an unhappy love affair, he sought to join Nicolas Baudin's expedition to Australian waters as an anthropological observer. Instead he was appointed as a trainee zoologist.

During the voyage, which charted significant stretches of the Australian coast between 1801 and 1803, Péron clashed repeatedly with Baudin. Péron was "in the habit of getting lost and returning dehydrated and exhausted while exploring. These habits were a constant source of irritation to Baudin". When Stanislas Levillain and René Maugé died, Péron rose to prominence as the sole remaining zoologist. Baudin had already lost numerous officers, sailors, savants and artists who deserted in Mauritius. With the aid of the artist Charles Alexandre Lesueur, Péron was largely responsible for gathering some 100,000 zoological specimens—the most comprehensive Australian natural history collection to date. Although he died before he could fully study his specimens, Péron made a major contribution to the foundations of the natural sciences in Australia and was a prescient ecological thinker. He was also a pioneer oceanographer who conducted important experiments on sea water temperatures at depth.

As a Corresponding Member of the Société des observateurs de l'homme, Péron wrote a great deal about the Tasmanian Aborigines of the D'Entrecasteaux Channel, on south-eastern Tasmania. Within 30 years almost all were dead through disease and war. The Australian historian Edward Duyker has shown that he has been unfairly accused of polygenism and racism, mainly because of a mistranslation of extracts from one of his scientific papers. He was more likely observing the state of affairs, with the British having been accused of a deliberate attempt at genocide in Tasmania.

Baudin died before he could return to France, and it was Péron who began writing the official account of the expedition: Journey of Discovery to the Southern Lands (Voyage de découvertes aux terres australes). In doing so, he committed a great injustice to his former commander's memory by magnifying his faults and frequently distorting the historical record. In the wake of the resumed fighting between France and Britain, Péron also drafted a secret Memo on English settlements in New Holland (Mémoire sur les établissements anglais à la Nouvelle Hollande), which advocated a French conquest of Port Jackson with the aid of rebellious Irish convicts.

== Death and legacy ==
Péron died of tuberculosis in his hometown of Cérilly in 1810. He was just thirty-five years old. The task of completing the official account of the expedition fell to Louis de Freycinet.

Peron Place in the Canberra suburb of Banks is named in his honour.

== Speies named in honour of Péron ==
Several species of reptiles, amphibians and mammals were named in honour of Péron:

- Pengilleyia peronii (Tschudi, 1838) – Péron’s treefrog (Pelodryadidae)
- Limnodynastes peronii (A.M.C. Duméril & Bibron, 1841) – striped marsh frog (Limnodynastidae)
- Carlia peronii (A.M.C. Duméril & Bibron, 1839) – Timor rainbow skink (Scincidae)
- Hemiergis peronii (Gray, 1831) – lowland earless skink (Scincidae)
- Hydrophis peronii (A.M.C. Duméril, 1853) – spiny seasnake (Elapidae)
- Lissodelphis peronii Lacépède, 1804 – southern right whale dolphin (Delphinidae)
- Phyllorhiza peronlesueuri (Goy, 1990) – a jellyfish (Mastigiidae). The specific epithet also honors Charles Alexandre Lesueur of the Baudin expedition.

== Taxa described by Péron ==
In the 1807 first volume of Journey of Discovery to the Southern Lands, Péron described a number of frog species collected on his travels, but most are considered incertae sedis today (i.e., Rana pollicifera and Rana pustulosa in Anura, Hyla ianopoda, Hyla nebulosa, Hyla ocellata and Hyla rubeola in Hylidae: Pelodryadinae, and Bufo leucogaster and Bufo proteus in Myobatrachidae). Hyla cyanea was synonymised with Litoria caerulea (White, 1790) – White's treefrog, but Hyla citripoda does survive as a valid species, Litoria citropa (Péron, 1807) – Blue Mountains treefrog.

See also Category:Taxa named by François Péron.

== Publications ==
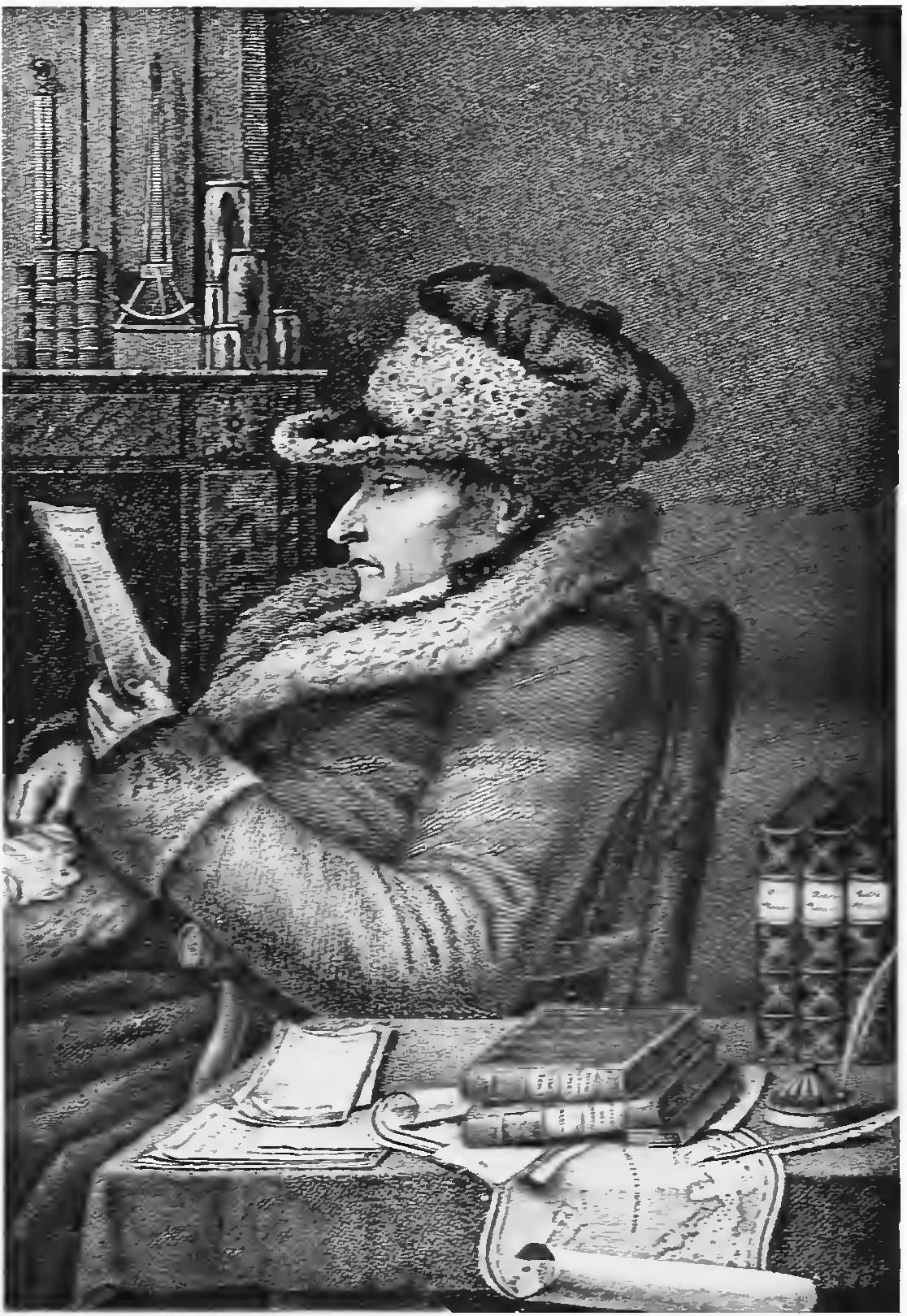
Péron in Terre Napoleón; a history of French explorations and projects in Australia, 2nd Ed. Scott. 1911.

—— Observations sur l’anthropologie, ou l’Histoire naturelle de l’homme, la nécessité de s’occuper de l’avancement de cette science, et l’importance de l’admission sur la Flotte du capitaine Baudin d’un ou de plusieurs Naturalistes, spécialement chargés des Recherches à faire sur cet objet, Stoupe, Paris, an VIII [1800].

—— Voyage de découvertes aux Terres Australes, exécuté par ordre de sa Majesté, l’Empereur et Roi, sur les corvettes le Géographe, le Naturaliste et la goëlette le Casuarina, pendant les années 1800, 1801, 1802, 1803 et 1804, L’Imprimerie Impériale, 3 vols and atlas, Paris, 1807–17; vol. i, Historique, 1807; vol. ii, Historique [completed by L. de Freycinet], 1816; vol. iii, Navigation et géographie [by L. de Freycinet], 1815; Atlas historique [by C. A. Leseur & N. Petit], 1817.

—— A Voyage of Discovery to the Southern Hemisphere Performed by Order of the Emperor Napoleon, During the Years 1801, 1802, 1803, and 1804, printed for Richard Phillips, Bridge Street, Blackfriars, by B. McMillan, Bow Street, Covent Garden, London, 1809.

Péron, F. [and de Freycinet, L.], Voyage de découvertes aux Terres Australes, fait par ordre du gouvernement, sur les corvettes le Géographe, le Naturaliste et la goëlette le Casuarina, pendant les années 1800, 1801, 1802, 1803 et 1804, 4 vols and atlas, Paris, 1824.

—— Voyage of Discovery to the Southern Lands, by François Péron, continued by Louis de Freycinet, 2nd edn 1824: Book IV, Comprising Chapters XXII to XXXIV (trans. C. Cornell; introduction by Anthony J. Brown), Friends of the State Library of South Australia, Adelaide, 2003.

Péron, François (2012) [1809]. A Voyage of Discovery to the Southern Hemisphere: Performed by Order of the Emperor Napoleon, during the Years 1801, 1802, 1803, and 1804. Project Gutenberg Australia. Wikidata Q128749102.

—— Entdeckungs-Reise nach den Süd-Ländern ausgefürt auf Befehl Sr. Majestät des Kaisers und Königs, auf den Corvetten dem Geographen, dem Naturalisten und der Golette dem Casuarina, während der Jahre 1800, 1801, 1802, 1803 und 1804 (trans. Ph. W. G. Hausleutner), J. G. Cotta’schen Buchhandlung, Tübingen, 2 vols, 1808–19.

Péron, F. A. [and de Freycinet. L.], Entdeckungsreise nach Australien unternommen auf Befehl Sr. Majestät des Kaisers von Frankreich und Königs von Italien mit den Korvetten der Geograph und der Naturalist, und der goelette Kasuarina in den Jahren 1800 bis 1804 (trans. T. F. Ehrmann), Verlage des Landes-Industrie-Comptoirs, Weimar, 2 vols, 1808–19.

Péron, F., ‘Discours préliminaire d’un travail sur les Méduses’, Procès-verbaux des séances de l’Académie, Classe des Sciences physiques et mathématiques, tome iv, séances du 21 novembre 1808, 28 novembre 1808 et 19 décembre 1808, pp. 136, 140, 147.

—— ‘Inventaire général de tous les objets relatifs à l’histoire de l’homme recueillis pendant le cours de l’expédition ou remis à M. Péron, naturaliste zoologiste du Gouvernement dans cette expédition, et présentés par M. Geoffroy et lui à Sa Majesté l’Impératrice Joséphine le 9 prairial an XII [29 May 1804]’ in Copans, J. and Jamin, J. (eds), Aux origines de l’anthropologie française: Les Mémoires de la Société des Observateurs de l’Homme en l’an VIII, Le Sycomore, Paris, 1978, pp. 195–203.

—— ‘Mémoire sur le nouveau genre Pyrosoma’, Annales du Muséum national d’Histoire naturelle, tome 4, an XII (1804), pp. 437–46, planche 72.

—— ‘Mémoire sur les établissement anglais à la Nouvelle Hollande, à la Terre de Diemen et dans les archipels du grand océan Pacifique …‘, présentation, édition et notes de Roger Martin, transcription du manuscrit avec le concours de Jacqueline Bonnemains, préface de Joël Eymeret, Revue de l’Institut Napoléon, No. 176, 1998, I, pp. 1–187.

—— ‘Mémoire sur quelques faits zoologiques applicables à la théorie du globe, lu à la Classe des Sciences physiques et mathématiques de l’Institut national (Séance du 30 vendémiaire an XIII)’, Journal de physique, de chimie, d’histoire naturelle et des arts, vol. 59, 1804, pp. 463–80, planches i, ii.

—— ‘Notice d’un mémoire sur les animaux observés pendant la traversée de Timor au Cap Sud de la Terre de Van Diemen’, Bulletin des sciences de la Société philomatique, no. xi, 8e année, tome iii, no. 95, pluviôse an 13 [December 1804–January 1805], pp. 269–70.

—— ‘Notice sur quelques applications utiles des observations météorologiques à l’hygiène navale’, Journal de physique, de chimie, d’histoire naturelle et des arts, vol. 67, 1808, pp. 29–43.

—— ‘Observations sur la dyssenterie des pays chauds et sur l’usage du bétel’, Journal de physique, de chimie, d’histoire naturelle et des arts, vol. 59, 1804, pp. 290–9.

—— ‘Réponse de M. Péron, naturaliste de l’expédition de découvertes aux Terres Australes aux observations critiques de M. Dumont sur le tablier des femmes Hottentotes’, Journal de physique, de chimie et d’histoire naturelle, tome lxi, 1805, pp. 210–17.

—— ‘Sur la température de la mer soit à sa surface, soit à diverses profondeurs’, Annales du Muséum national d’histoire naturelle, tome 5, an XIII (1804), pp. 123–48 [English translation: ‘Fragment from Peron, with notices from other voyagers, on the Temperature of the Sea, at great depths, far from Land’, American Journal of Science, vol. xvii, 1830, pp. 295–9].

Péron, F. and Lesueur, C.-A., ‘Observations sur le tablier des femmes Hottentotes, avec une note sur l’expédition française aux Terres Australes, et une étude critique sur la stéatopygie et le tablier des femmes Boschimanes, par le Dr Raphaël Blanchard’, Bulletin de la Société zoologique de France, vol. 8, 1883, pp. 15–33.

—— ‘Des caractères génériques et spécifiques de toutes les espèces de Méduses connues jusqu’à ce jour’, Annales du Muséum national d’histoire naturelle, tome 14, 1809, pp. 325–66.

—— ‘Histoire de la famille des Molluques Ptéropodes’, Annales du Muséum national d’histoire naturelle, tome 15, 1810, pp. 57–69, 2 planches.

—— ‘Histoire du genre Firole: Firola’, Annales du Muséum national d’histoire naturelle, tome 15, 1810, pp. 76–82.

—— ‘Histoire générale et particulière de tous les animaux qui composent la famillle des Méduses’, Annales du Muséum national d’histoire naturelle, tome 14, 1809, pp. 218–28.

—— ‘La conservation des diverses espèces d’animation dans l’alcool’, Journal de physique de chimie, d’histoire naturelle et des arts, vol. 71, octobre 1810, pp. 265–88.

—— ‘Notice sur l’habitation des animaux marins’, Annales du Muséum national d’histoire naturelle, tome 15, 1810, pp. 287–92.

—— ‘Notice sur l’habitation des phoques’, Annales du Muséum national d’histoire naturelle, tome 15, 1810, pp. 293–00.

—— ‘Sur les Méduses du genre Equorée’, Annales du Muséum national d’Histoire naturelle, tome 15, 1810, pp. 41–56.

—— ‘Tableau des caractères génériques et spécifiques de toutes les espèces de Méduses connues jusqu’à ce jour’, Annales du Muséum national d’histoire naturelle, tome 14, 1809 [1810], pp. 325–66.

== See also ==
- Tasmanian Aborigines
- Truganini
- European and American voyages of scientific exploration
