= Carlia crypta =

Scientific classification
- Kingdom: Animalia
- Phylum: Chordata
- Class: Reptilia
- Order: Squamata
- Family: Scincidae
- Genus: Carlia
- Species: C. crypta

Binomial name
- Carlia crypta Singhal, Hoskin, Couper, Potter, & Moritz, 2018

Species of lizard

Carlia crypta is a species of skink in the genus Carlia. It is native to Queensland in Australia.
