= Carlia sukur =

Scientific classification
- Kingdom: Animalia
- Phylum: Chordata
- Class: Reptilia
- Order: Squamata
- Family: Scincidae
- Genus: Carlia
- Species: C. sukur

Binomial name
- Carlia sukur Zug & Kaiser, 2014

Species of lizard

Carlia sukur, the Sukur four-toed skink, is a species of skink in the genus Carlia. It is native to Indonesia.
