= Glen Milton Storr =

Australian ornithologist and herpetologist

- Born: 27 December 1921; Adelaide
- Died: 26 June 1990 (aged 68); Perth
- Scientific career
- Fields: Ornithology
- Institutions: Lands Department South Australia, Western Australian Museum
- Author abbrev. (botany): G.M.Storr
- Author abbrev. (zoology): Storr

Dr. Glen Milton Storr (27 December 1921 – 26 June 1990) was an Australian ornithologist and herpetologist. He joined the Western Australian Museum in 1962 and became curator of ornithology and herpetology in 1965. He was a member of the Royal Australasian Ornithologists Union (RAOU), and served as secretary of the Western Australian Branch of the RAOU in 1954.

Storr produced his postgraduate research on kangaroos. His tenure as curator at the WA museum ended in 1986.

== Career ==
Storr was born in Adelaide in 1921, and had become a cadet land surveyor with the South Australian Lands Department in 1939. World War II interrupted his training when he joined the Australian Infantry in 1942, serving with the Second Ninth Field Regiment in New Guinea and Queensland (1943–1945). Following the war, he became a licensed surveyor in South Australia in 1947.

== Legacy ==
Storr was one of the most prolific alpha-taxonomists in herpetology, describing 232 species and subspecies of reptiles, which places him in the top-10 of all-time world-wide. He is commemorated in the scientific names of five species of reptiles: Carlia storri, Ctenotus storri, Lerista storri, Morethia storri, and Varanus storri.
