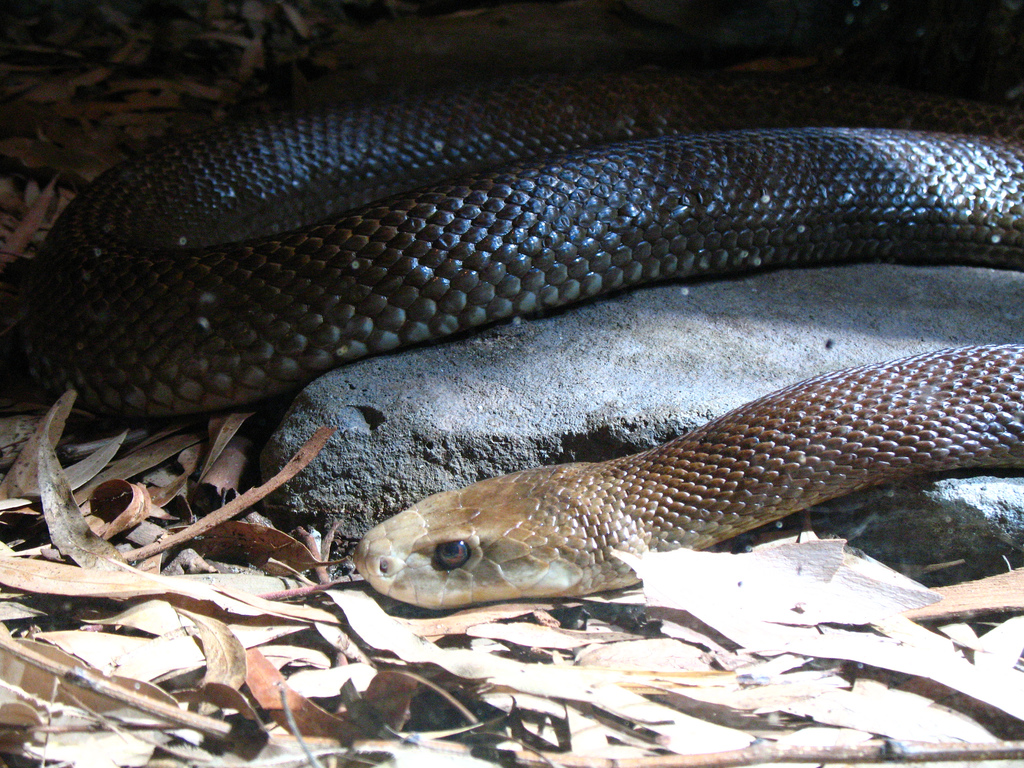

Conservation status
- Least Concern (IUCN 3.1)

Scientific classification
- Kingdom: Animalia
- Phylum: Chordata
- Class: Reptilia
- Order: Squamata
- Suborder: Serpentes
- Family: Elapidae
- Genus: Oxyuranus
- Species: O. scutellatus

Binomial name
- Oxyuranus scutellatus (W. Peters, 1867)
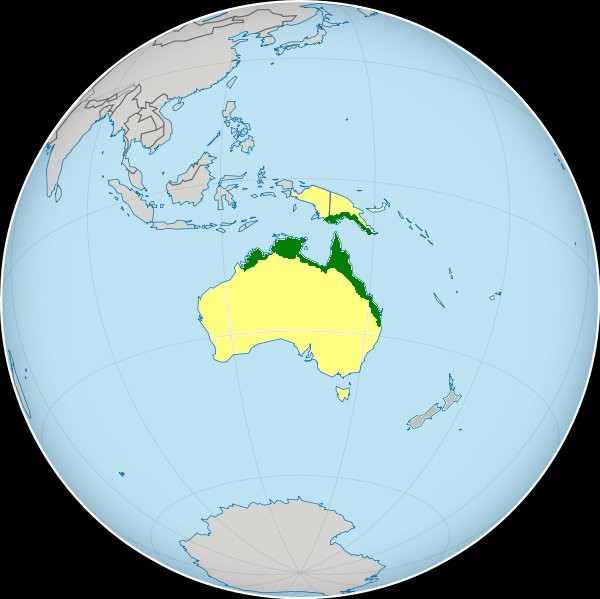
- Distribution of Oxyuranus scutellatus in green

Synonyms
- Pseudechis scutellatus W. Peters, 1867; Pseudechis wilesmithii De Vis, 1911; Oxyuranus scutellatus — Kinghorn, 1923

= Coastal taipan =

Venomous snake species native to Australia

The coastal taipan (Oxyuranus scutellatus), or common taipan, is a species of extremely venomous snake in the family Elapidae. Described by Wilhelm Peters in 1867, the species is native to the coastal regions of northern and eastern Australia and the island of New Guinea. The second-longest venomous snake in Australia, the coastal taipan averages around 2.0 m (6.6 ft) long, with the longest specimens reaching 2.9 m (9.5 ft) in length. It has light olive or reddish-brown upperparts, with paler underparts. The snake is considered to be a least-concern species according to the International Union for Conservation of Nature.

The coastal taipan is found in a wide range of habitats, from monsoon forests to open woodland, as well as human-modified habitats such as sugarcane fields. It mainly hunts and eats small mammals, and opportunistically takes bird prey. The species is oviparous.

According to most toxicological studies, this species is the third-most venomous land snake in the world after the inland taipan and eastern brown snake. Its venom is predominantly neurotoxic and coagulopathic.

== Taxonomy ==
German naturalist Wilhelm Peters described the coastal taipan as Pseudechis scutellatus in 1867, from material collected in Rockhampton, Queensland. Charles Walter De Vis described Pseudechis wilesmithii from Walsh River in north Queensland in 1911. In 1922, scientific bird collector William McLennan killed two snakes near Coen in far north Queensland. Impressed by their size—up to 2.76 m, he sent the skins and skulls to the Australian Museum in Sydney. Australian naturalist Roy Kinghorn established the genus Oxyuranus in 1923, describing a specimen from Coen as O. maclennani after its collector. He noted the distinctness of the palatine bone necessitated the new genus as distinct from all other elapid snakes. In 1930, Kinghorn announced it as the second largest venomous snake in the world, with 3/4 inch fangs. In 1933, Australian zoologist Donald Thomson concluded that Pseudechis scutellatus and Oxyuranus maclennani were the same species; this meant that Peters' specific epithet had priority, as did Kinghorn's genus as the species was highly distinct. Hence, the coastal taipan became Oxyuranus scutellatus. Thomson had spent some years in Cape York peninsula with the indigenous people, who told tales of a giant snake they greatly feared.

Australian herpetologist Ken Slater described Oxyuranus scutellatus canni, commonly known as the Papuan taipan, in 1956, on the basis of its distinctive coloration. He named it after George Cann, longtime Snake Man of La Perouse. It is found throughout the southern portion of the island of New Guinea.

Analysis of mitochondrial DNA by German herpetologist Wolfgang Wüster and colleagues in 2005 found the Papuan and nominate subspecies to be very similar genetically; however, their distinct coloration and limited sampling led Wüster to refrain from lumping the subspecies into a single taxon.

Raymond Hoser described Oxyuranus scutellatus barringeri from a specimen collected from the Mitchell Plateau, however Wüster declared this a nomen nudum as the author did not explain how it was distinct. Hoser replied that it was distinct on the basis of DNA and distribution, and published it under a different subspecific name—O. scutellatus andrewwilsoni—in 2009, reporting it had a more rounded head and rougher neck scales than other subspecies of coastal taipan, and lacked a lighter colour on the snout.

Kinghorn gave it the name "giant brown snake" in 1930, before Thomson introduced the term taipan in 1933. It is commonly called the coastal taipan, common taipan, or simply taipan. The New Guinea subspecies is known as the Papuan taipan. Local names in New Guinea include dirioro by the people of Parama village near the Fly River, and gobari near the Vailala River.

== Description ==
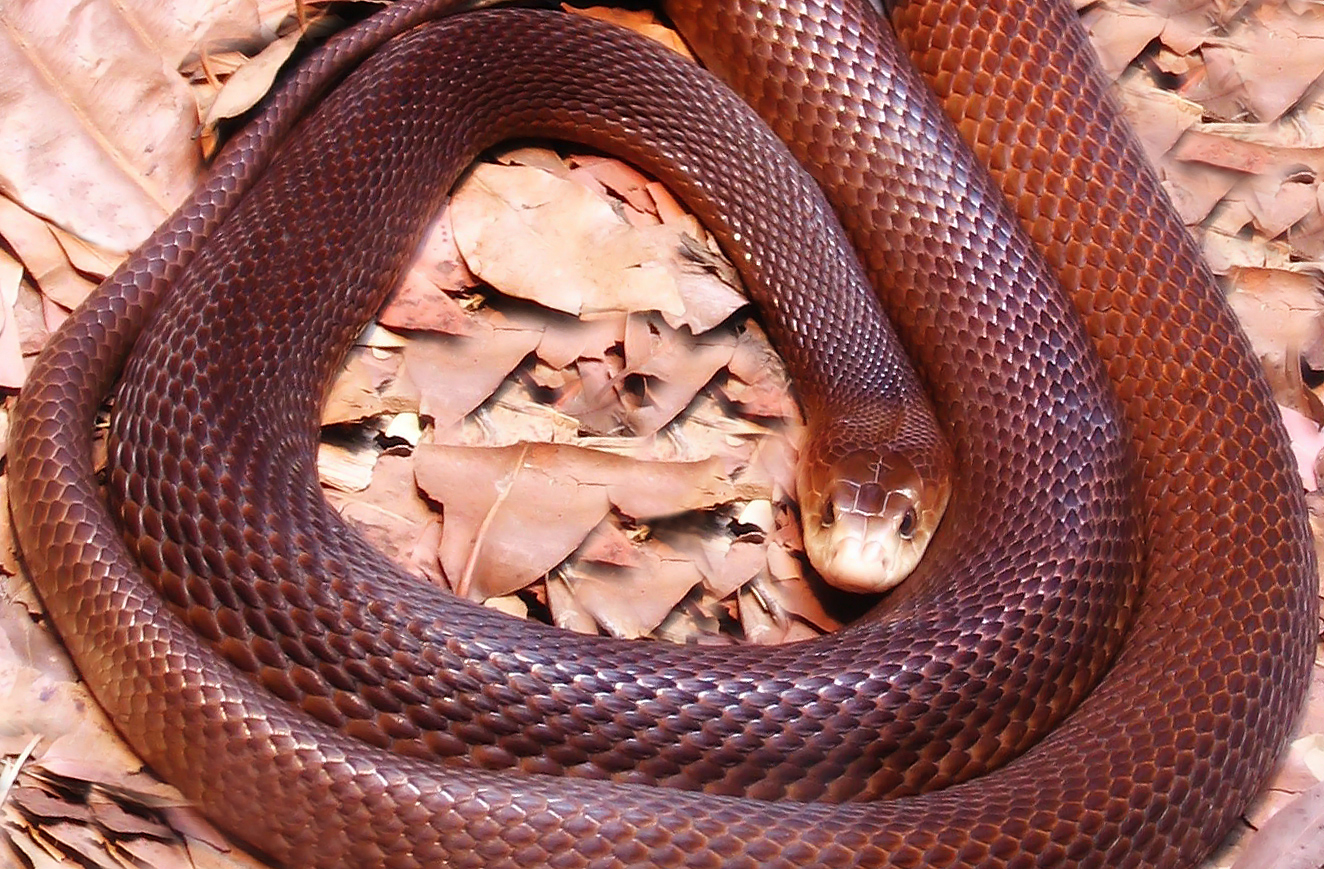
A coastal taipan

The coastal taipan is the second-longest venomous snake in Australia after the king brown snake (Pseudechis australis). Adult specimens of this species typically attain sexual maturity around 1.2 m (3.9 ft) in total length (including tail). More mature specimens can grow to between 1.5 and 2.0 m (4.9 and 6.6 ft). Other taipans, including the inland taipan, attain broadly similar sizes, although they tend to be slightly smaller in average size. A specimen of an average 2.0 m (6.6 ft) total length weighs around 3.0 kg (6.6 lb). According to the Queensland Museum, the longest recorded total length for the coastal taipan was a specimen that was 2.9 m (9.5 ft) and weighed 6.5 kg (14 lb). Though exceptionally rare, much larger specimens are widely believed to exist, including specimens of as much as 3.3 m (11 ft).

O. scutellatus has a long and narrow head with an angular brow and is lighter-coloured on the face. The body is slender and colouration can vary. It is often uniformly light olive or reddish-brown in colour, but some specimens may be dark gray to black. The colouration is lighter on the sides of the body, and the ventral side (the belly) is usually a creamy-white to a pale light yellow in colour, and is often marked with orange or pink flecks. Individuals undergo a seasonal change in colour, becoming darker in winter and fading in summer. The eyes are large, round, and are light brown or even hazel in colour with large pupils.

As a large, brownish snake, the coastal taipan resembles the eastern brown snake (Pseudonaja textilis), northern brown snake (P. nuchalis), and king brown snake, though can be distinguished by its larger head and narrow neck, and light face and snout. The head and neck are the same width in the other species.

=== Scalation ===
The number and arrangement of scales on a snake's body are key elements of identification to species level. The temporals are 2+3 (3+4). The dorsal scales are in 21–23 rows at mid-body. The ventrals number 220–250. The anal plate is single (undivided). The subcaudals number 45–80 and are divided. The scalation helps distinguish it from the king brown snake, which has a divided anal plate and 17 dorsal scales.

== Distribution and habitat ==
Considered to be a least-concern species according to the International Union for Conservation of Nature, the coastal taipan occurs in northern Australia and southern New Guinea. Its range extends from north-western Western Australia, the Northern Territory, across Cape York Peninsula, and south in eastern Queensland into northern New South Wales (as far south as Grafton). The coastal taipan, though, is not found in regions where the maximum winter temperature is below 20 °C (68 °F). The second subspecies (O. s. canni ) is found throughout the island of New Guinea, with higher concentrations of the snake being found in the nation of Papua New Guinea.

The coastal taipan can be found in a variety of different habitats, in warm, wetter, temperate to tropical coastal regions, monsoon forests, wet and dry sclerophyll forests and woodlands, and natural and artificial grassy areas, including grazing paddocks and disused rubbish tips. It appears to have become more common since the 1935 introduction of the cane toad. Whether this is because of reduced competition, as other large venomous snakes have declined after being poisoned by toads, or due to increased food supply of rodents is unclear. It has adapted well to sugarcane fields, where it thrives on the rodent population in the fields. In Far North Queensland in the Cape York Peninsula, it is usually found in open woodland areas. Thickets of introduced Lantana are also favoured habitat. The coastal taipan shelters in abandoned animal burrows, hollow logs, and piles of vegetation and litter.

== Behaviour ==
The coastal taipan is primarily diurnal, being mostly active in the early to midmorning period, although it may become nocturnal in hot weather conditions.

The consensus of snake handlers is that the coastal taipan tends to avoid confrontation, but becomes highly defensive if provoked.

=== Reproduction and lifespan ===
Breeding season takes place between August and December. The coastal taipan is oviparous, laying a clutch of 7 to 20 eggs. The eggs take 60 to 80 days to hatch, with the newly hatched snakes ranging from 30 to 34 cm (12 to 13 in) in length. The young grow quickly, averaging 6.7 cm (2.6 in) a month, and reaching a length of 1.0 m (3.3 ft) in a year. Male coastal taipans reach sexual maturity when they reach 80 cm in length, which they reach around 16 months of age, while females are able to breed when they are around 100 cm long, around 28 months old.

=== Diet ===
The coastal taipan's diet consists predominantly of rats, mice, and bandicoots, with various species of birds taken opportunistically. In 2010, a dead coastal taipan was found to have ingested a cane toad. Whether the snake had been poisoned by the toad and died, or had resisted the poison and been killed by a vehicle (as it was found on a road with neck trauma) was unknown.

When hunting, it appears to actively scan for prey using its well-developed eyesight, and is often seen traveling with its head raised slightly above ground level. Once prey is detected, the snake "freezes" before hurling itself forward and issuing several quick bites. The prey is released and allowed to stagger away. This strategy minimises the snake's chance of being harmed in retaliation, particularly by rats, which can inflict lethal damage with their long incisors and claws.

The coastal taipan closely resembles the African black mamba (Dendroaspis polylepis) in body shape, venom toxicity, and hunting behaviour—both employing a "snap and release" strategy. This convergence is thought due to their adaptation to hunting mammals; the large size is needed to eat large prey, and lethal venom is to immobilise prey quickly before they can damage the predator.

== Venom ==
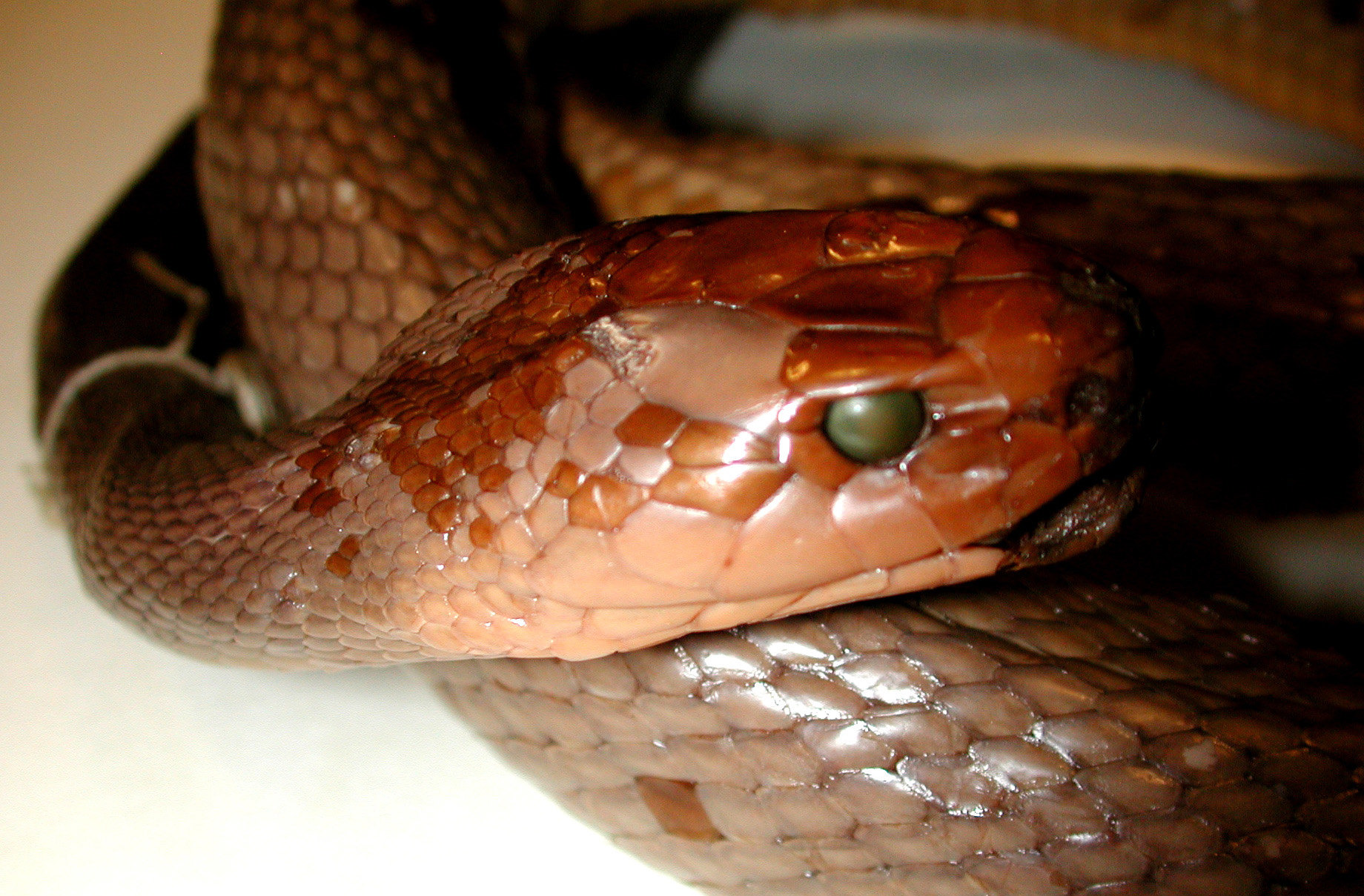
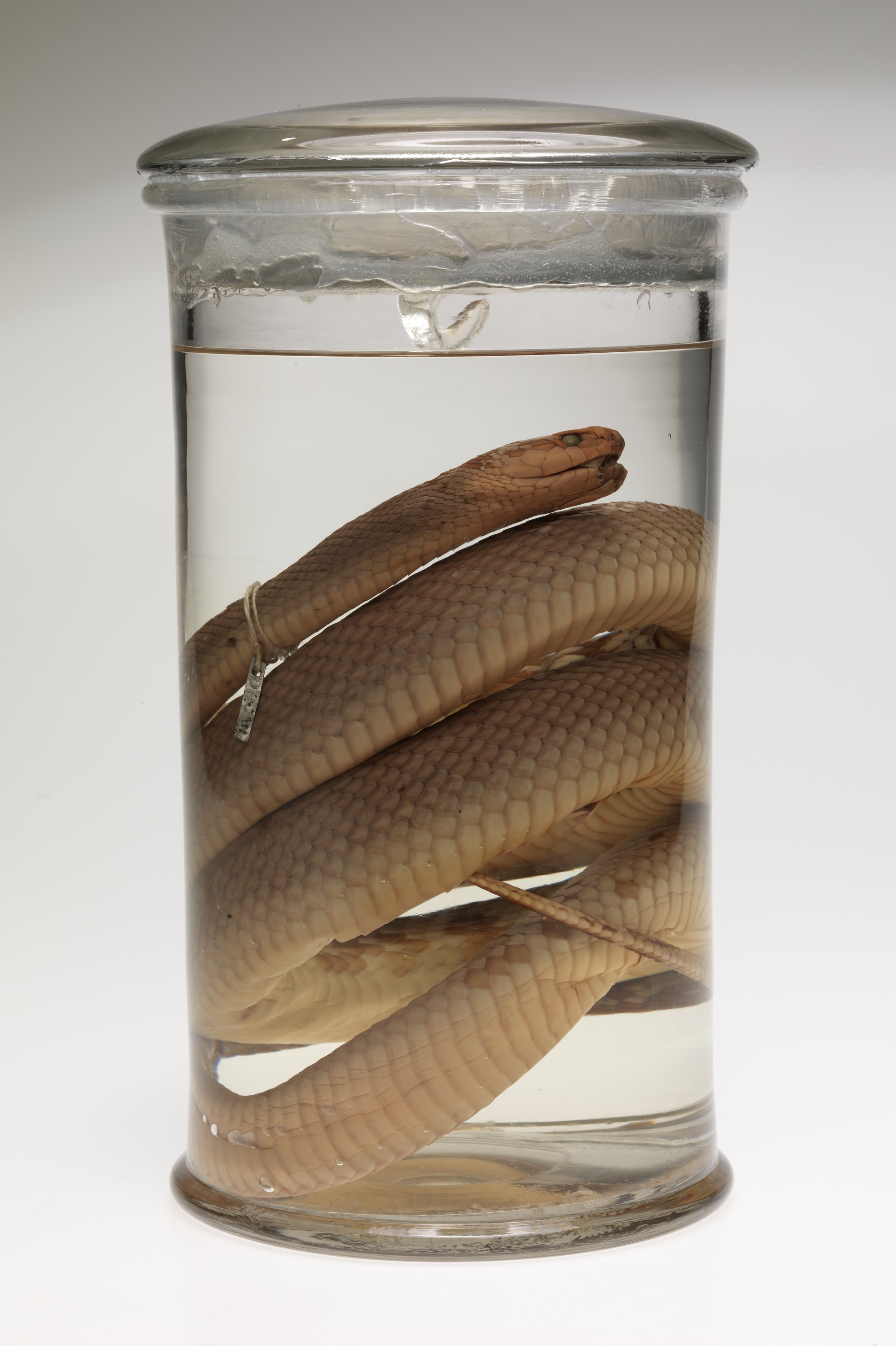
This specimen was captured by Budden in 1950, from whose venom the first taipan antivenom was made. Currently, it is preserved in spirits and stored in the collections of Museums Victoria.

Generally feared more than any other Australian snake, the coastal taipan is considered the third-most venomous terrestrial snake in the world, behind the inland taipan and eastern brown snake. It is classified as a snake of medical importance by the World Health Organization. (Note: Snakes of medical importance include those with highly dangerous venom resulting in high rates of morbidity and mortality, or those that are common agents in snakebite.)

In 1935, local health authorities established a register of cases of injury by plants and animals in northern Queensland. By 1940, one survivor (who lost his sense of smell for some months) and two fatalities had been recorded from coastal taipan bites, with another three historical fatalities added in 1944. George Rosendale, a Guugu Yimithirr man, was bitten through his boots and thick socks while stacking wood. He became sick 15–30 minutes later, with ptosis, nausea, and difficulty breathing, and was conveyed to Cooktown Hospital. A doctor visiting the area on holiday treated him with fluids, and tiger snake antivenom flown up from Cairns. He was flown to Cairns Hospital the next day and was discharged after 19 days. He also reported losing his sense of smell. Rosendale became a Lutheran pastor and died at age 89 in 2019.

Articles about how dangerous the species was appeared more frequently in newspapers and books from the late 1930s onwards, including wild tales of it hiding in trees and dropping on victims. Australian naturalist and writer Charles Barrett reported that one had pursued a person for two hours before being killed with a brush hook. After a specimen was found in the Northern Territory in 1947, fears were raised it may occur further south in more populated areas of Queensland. Mackay snakehandler Ram Chandra traveled around Queensland and northern NSW, in part funded by the sugar industry. Sugarcane growers began to have trouble finding workers due to fears around the taipan. To counteract fears, the Queensland Cane Growers' Council produced an article in 1956 to calm panic, and Eric Worrell and David Fleay pointed out the snake's inherent shyness.

In 1949 and 1950, 19-year-old snake handler Kevin Budden visited north Queensland to catch a taipan in a quest to develop antivenom. On 27 July 1950, he caught a specimen sunning itself in a rubbish dump on the outskirts of Cairns by putting his foot on it, grasping it by the neck with his left hand and letting it coil around his arm. He then walked to a main road and hailed a passing truck to take him to the house of local naturalist S.E. Stephens. Once there, the taipan escaped his grasp as he attempted to adjust his hold and bit his hand. Despite this, he secured the snake before going to hospital. He became paralysed later that day and succumbed early the following afternoon despite ventilation and large doses of tiger snake antivenom. Before he died, Budden requested the snake be sent to the Commonwealth Serum Laboratories, which in turn forwarded it to Fleay for milking. Fleay did so successfully, but found wrestling with the surprisingly strong and muscular subject to be difficult. They procured 78 mg of whitish venom, which led to the development of taipan antivenom. The snake itself became a minor celebrity, discussed in many newspapers at the time. It was taken to and put on display in Melbourne Zoo, but died on 12 September 1950.

Taipan antivenom became available by mid-1955, and it was used for the first time on 10-year-old Bruce Stringer, who had been bitten at his school south of Cairns.

As well as describing the Papuan taipan, Slater was instrumental in capturing and milking taipans both in New Guinea and Australia. In Bereina west of Port Moresby in 1957, Slater encountered a pair of taipans mating and bagged them, but was bitten by the male in the process. He managed to insert a syringe into a vein in his left ankle and give himself taipan antivenom. Despite this, he sickened and spent 10 days in hospital. Slater was the only person milking snakes for the PNG Department of Agriculture. After he resigned in 1959, the department announced they would pay £8/foot for each Papuan taipan caught; which equates to approximately $300 AUD/foot as of 2024. Dismayed, Slater feared that unskilled people would be emboldened to try to catch them; one person was reported to have died this way during this period.

Coastal taipans were responsible for 4% (31 cases) of identified snakebite victims in Australia between 2005 and 2015, though no deaths were recorded in this cohort. At least one death from this species was recorded in a coronial retrospective study of snakebites from 2000 to 2016, and two between 1981 and 1991. Bites from the coastal taipan account for most snakebites in New Guinea in the rainy season, when the snake becomes more active, particularly in southern parts of the island.

Clinically, envenomation from coastal taipan bites commonly leads to neurotoxic effects, characterised by descending flaccid paralysis, ptosis, diplopia, ophthalmoplegia, bulbar weakness, intercostal weakness, and limb weakness. Severe cases require intubation. Venom-induced consumption coagulopathy is also common, characterised by clotting abnormalities and haemorrhage. Less-common effects are muscle damage (myotoxicity), characterised by elevated creatine kinase and myalgia (muscle pain), acute kidney injury (which can require dialysis in severe cases), and general systemic symptoms such as nausea and vomiting, diaphoresis (sweating), and abdominal pain. White cell count is commonly elevated and platelet count is often low. There is generally little local reaction at the site of the bite.

The average venom yield from one milking is 120 mg, with a maximum recorded of 400 mg. The subcutaneous LD_{50} value of this species is 0.106 mg/kg, according to the Australian Venom and Toxin database, or 0.12 mg/kg, according to Engelmann and Obst (1981). The estimated lethal dose for humans is 3 mg. Its venom contains primarily taicatoxin, a highly potent neurotoxin, along with taipoxin, which has an LD_{50} of 2 μg/kg. 124 μg of the latter can kill a healthy 62 kg adult.

=== Treatment ===
Early administration (within 2–6 hours of bite) of antivenom and intubation for respiratory paralysis are keystones of management, but a chance of a hypersensivity reaction exists following antivenom administration. Neurotoxic symptoms may be irreversible once established due to the presynaptic nature of their pathology.

The first taipan-specific antivenom was developed in 1954. Before this, tiger snake antivenom was used, though it was of little benefit in taipan envenomation.

== Captivity ==
David Fleay began breeding coastal taipans in 1958, work by Charles Tanner (1911–1996) and him in keeping them in captivity facilitated the production of antivenom. They have proven adaptable to captivity, though they are fast-growing and require food year-round.
