= Scutelarin =

Identifiers
- EC no.: 3.4.21.60
- CAS no.: 93389-45-8

Databases
- IntEnz: IntEnz view
- BRENDA: BRENDA entry
- ExPASy: NiceZyme view
- KEGG: KEGG entry
- MetaCyc: metabolic pathway
- PRIAM: profile
- PDB structures: RCSB PDB PDBe PDBsum
Search
- PMC: articles
- PubMed: articles
- NCBI: proteins

Scutelarin (EC 3.4.21.60, taipan activator, Oxyuranus scutellatus prothrombin-activating proteinase) is an enzyme. This enzyme catalyses the following chemical reaction

Selective cleavage of Arg-Thr and Arg-Ile in prothrombin to form thrombin and two inactive fragments

This enzyme is isolated from the venom of the Taipan snake (Oxyuranus scutellatus).
