= Central Ranges taipan =

Conservation status
- Least Concern (IUCN 3.1)

Scientific classification
- Kingdom: Animalia
- Phylum: Chordata
- Class: Reptilia
- Order: Squamata
- Suborder: Serpentes
- Family: Elapidae
- Genus: Oxyuranus
- Species: O. temporalis

Binomial name
- Oxyuranus temporalis Doughty, Maryan, Donnellan & Hutchinson, 2007

Highly venomous snake native to Central Australia

The Central Ranges taipan, or Western Desert taipan (Oxyuranus temporalis), is a species of extremely venomous taipan that was discovered in 2007 by Australian researchers Paul Doughty, Brad Maryan, Stephen Donnellan, and Mark Hutchinson. Taipans are large, fast-moving, and extremely venomous Australasian snakes. The Central Ranges taipan was named one of the top-five new species of 2007 by the International Institute for Species Exploration at Arizona State University.

== Discovery ==
Dr. Mark Hutchinson, reptile and amphibian curator at the South Australian Museum, caught the immature female taipan while it was crossing a dirt track on a sunny afternoon. The reptile was about 1.0 m (39 inches) in total length (body and tail), but because taipan species are among the most venomous snakes in the world, Hutchinson did not inspect the creature on site. He bagged the snake and sent it, along with others captured from the trip, to the Western Australian Museum in Perth for closer inspection.

Two weeks later, the new species was studied. At first, it was tentatively identified as a western brown snake because of the similar size and colouring; several weeks later, however, Western Australia Museum reptile collection manager Brad Maryan noticed the now-preserved snake had a large, pale head similar to the coastal taipan.

The holotype, nicknamed "Scully" after the X-Files TV character, is an immature snake about 1 m long, which means that scientists do not know the true adult size of the species, though some taipans can reach a total length of about 3 m (about 10 ft). This is the first new taipan species to be discovered in 125 years.

== New species ==
O. temporalis differs from its two congeneric species O. scutellatus and O. microlepidotus in lacking a temporol labial scale and having six rather than seven infralabial scales. Phylogenetic analysis of mtDNA sequences showed it to be the sister species of the two previously known taipans.

== Venom ==
The two other described species of Oxyuranus are among the most venomous land snakes in the world - O. microlepidotus ranked the most venomous land snake and O. scutellatus the third-most venomous after Pseudonaja textilis. The new species, O. temporalis, has a LD_{50} measured on mice to be 0.075 mg/Kg, making it likely to be extremely dangerous to a human if bitten, albeit less toxic than the inland taipan, which was found by the same study to have a LD_{50} of 0.0225 mg/kg.

== 2010 rediscovery ==
In May 2010, a second specimen of O. temporalis was found in the Great Victoria Desert of Western Australia. The adult female taipan measuring 1.3 m (4.3 ft) in total length was captured by Spinifex people from Tjuntjuntjara during a biological study at Ilkurlka, 165 km west of the South Australian border, 425 km south of the location of the initial discovery.
