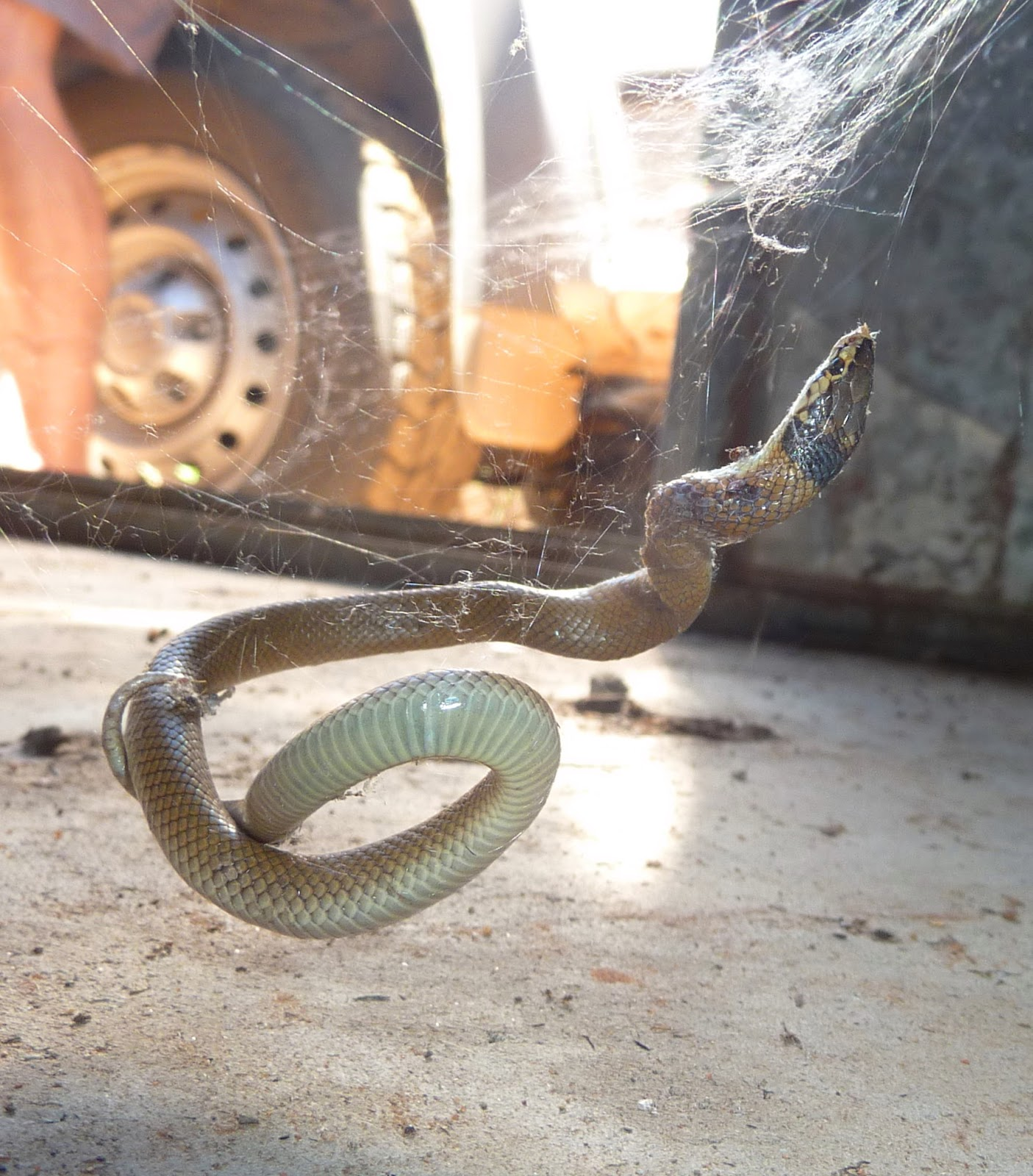
- Suta suta, curl snake

Scientific classification
- Kingdom: Animalia
- Phylum: Chordata
- Class: Reptilia
- Order: Squamata
- Suborder: Serpentes
- Family: Elapidae
- Genus: Suta; Worrell, 1961

= Suta (snake) =

Genus of snakes

Suta is a genus of venomous snakes in the family Elapidae. The genus is endemic to mainland Australia.

== Species ==
- Suta dwyeri (Worrell, 1956) – Dwyer's snake, variable black-naped snake, whip snake – New South Wales, Queensland
- Suta fasciata (Rosén, 1905) – Rosen's snake – Western Australia
- Suta flagellum (McCoy, 1878) – little whip snake, whip hooded snake – New South Wales, South Australia, Victoria
- Suta gaikhorstorum Maryan, Brennan, Hutchinson, & Geidans, 2020 – Pilbara hooded snake – Western Australia
- Suta gouldii (Gray, 1841) – black-headed snake, Gould's hooded snake – Western Australia
- Suta monachus (Storr, 1964) – hooded snake, monk snake – New South Wales, Northern Territory, South Australia, Western Australia
- Suta nigriceps (Günther, 1863) – black-backed snake, copper snake, Mallee black-backed snake, Mitchell's short-tailed snake – New South Wales, South Australia, Victoria, Western Australia
- Suta ordensis (Storr, 1984) – Ord curl snake – Northern Territory (?), Western Australia
- Suta punctata (Boulenger, 1896) – little spotted snake, spotted snake – Northern Territory, Queensland, Western Australia
- Suta spectabilis (Krefft, 1869) – Port Lincoln snake, spectacled hooded snake – New South Wales, Queensland, South Australia, Victoria, Western Australia
- Suta suta (W. Peters, 1863) – curl snake (eastern states), myall snake (Western Australia) – New South Wales, Northern Territory, Queensland, South Australia, Western Australia

== Toxicity ==
Snakes belonging to the genus Suta are mildly to highly venomous, depending on the species.
