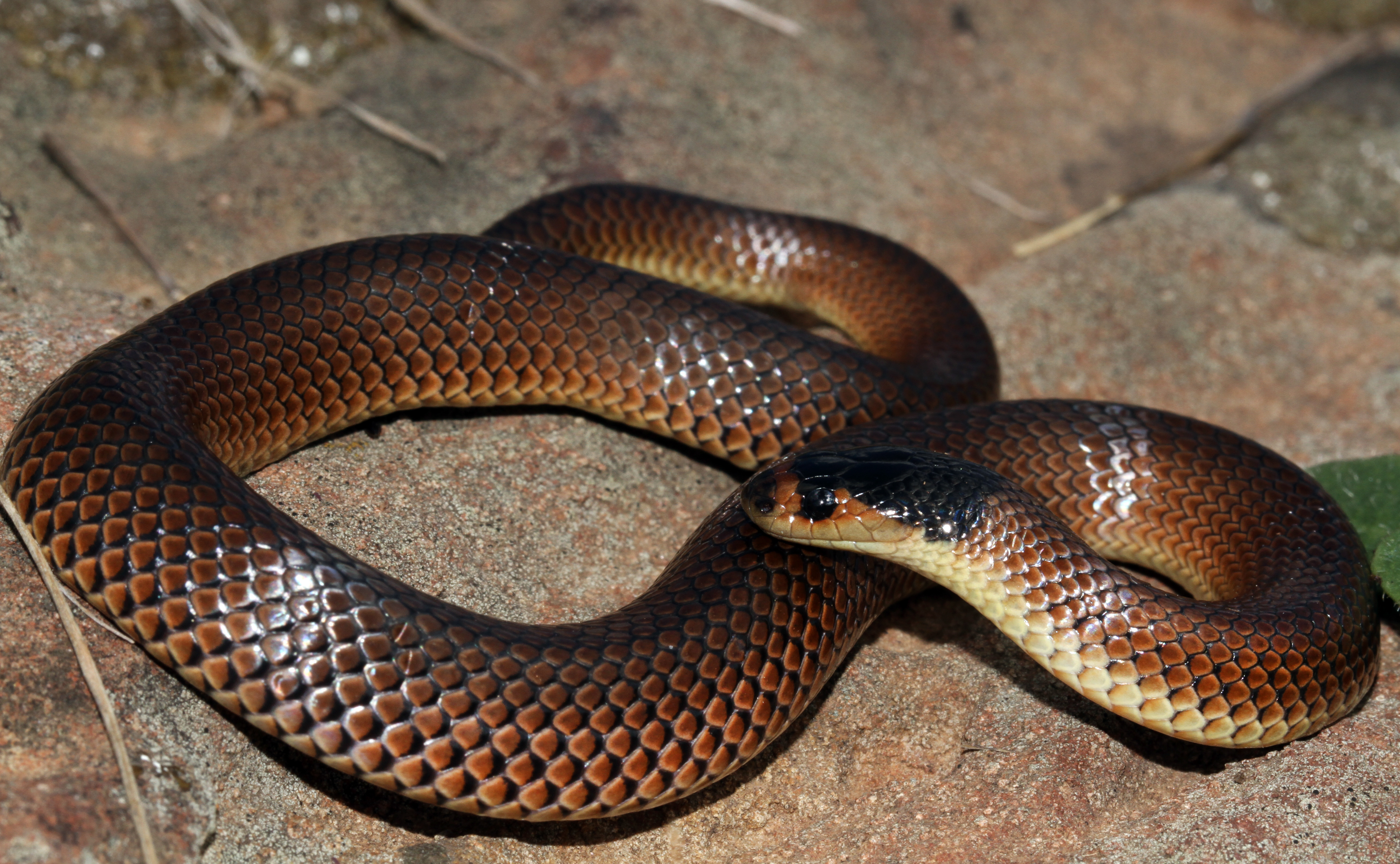

Conservation status
- Least Concern (IUCN 3.1)

Scientific classification
- Kingdom: Animalia
- Phylum: Chordata
- Class: Reptilia
- Order: Squamata
- Suborder: Serpentes
- Family: Elapidae
- Genus: Suta
- Species: S. flagellum

Binomial name
- Suta flagellum (F. McCoy, 1878)

Synonyms
- Hoploceaphalus flagellum F. McCoy, 1878; Denisonia flagellum — Boulenger, 1896; Cryptophis flagellum — Worrell, 1961; Suta flagellum — McDowell, 1970; Unechis flagellum — Cogger, 1975; Rhinoplocephalus flagellum — Storr, 1984; Parasuta flagellum — Greer, 2006

= Little whip snake =

Species of snake in Australia

The little whip snake (Suta flagellum), also known commonly as the whip hooded snake, is a species of venomous snake in the family Elapidae. The species is endemic to Australia.

== Description ==
S. flagellum can have a total length (including tail) of up to 45 cm (18 in). Its most notable feature is the black patch, shaped like an hourglass, which extends from the back of its nape to between the eyes. The body of the snake is orange to tan dorsally, and cream-colored ventrally.

== Behavior ==
S. flagellum is generally nocturnal and found under rocks and logs.

== Diet ==
The whip hooded snake preys upon lizards and frogs.

== Habitat ==
In New South Wales, the preferred natural habitats of S. flagellum are temperate grasslands and grassy woodlands.

== Venom ==
The little whip snake is venomous, though virtually harmless to humans.

== Reproduction ==
S. flagellum is viviparous. Brood size is seven or fewer.
