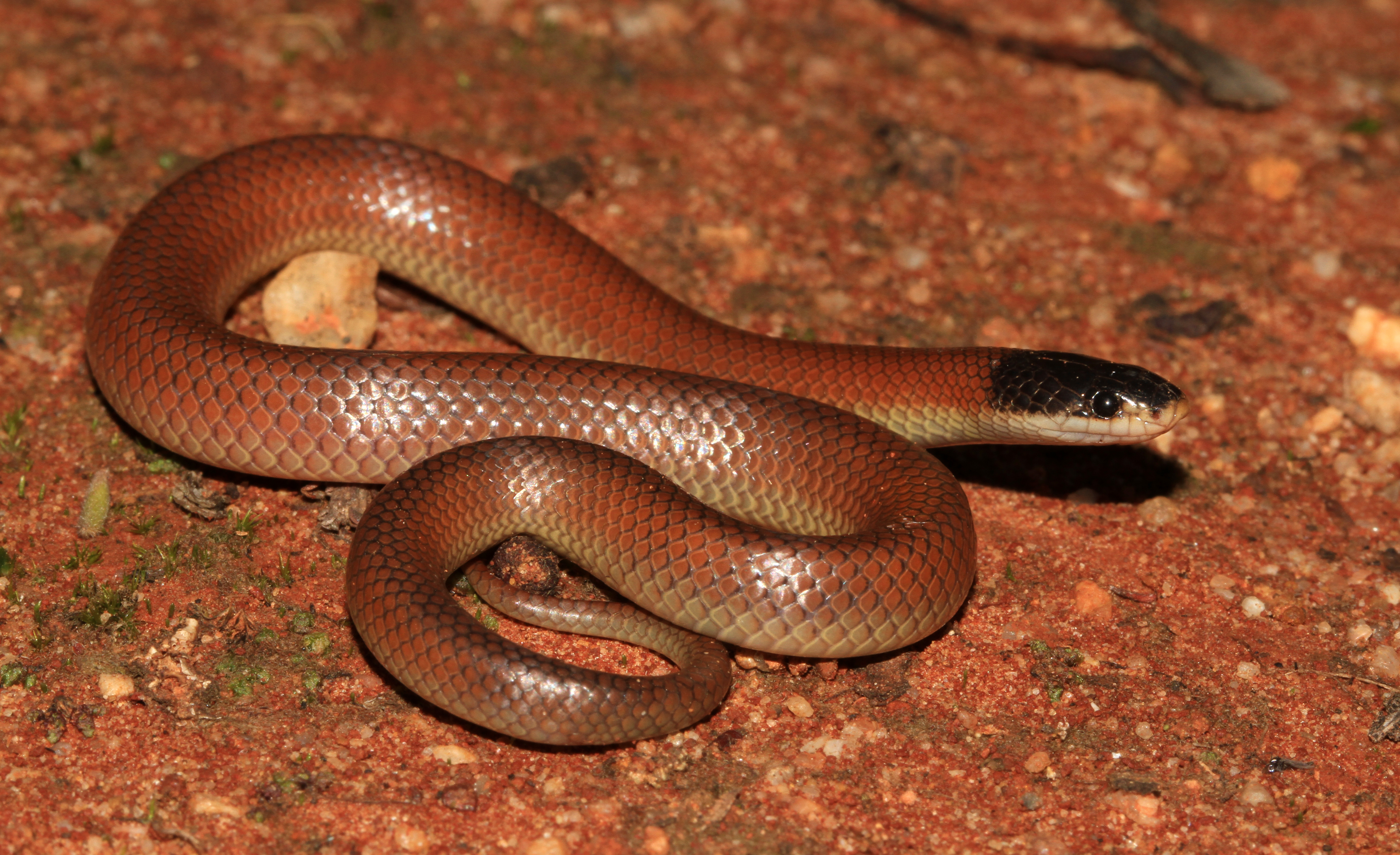

Conservation status
- Least Concern (IUCN 3.1)

Scientific classification
- Kingdom: Animalia
- Phylum: Chordata
- Class: Reptilia
- Order: Squamata
- Suborder: Serpentes
- Family: Elapidae
- Genus: Suta
- Species: S. dwyeri

Binomial name
- Suta dwyeri (Worrell, 1956)

Synonyms
- Denisonia dwyeri Worrell, 1956; Unechis dwyeri — Cogger, 1983; Suta dwyeri — Valentic, 1998; Suta spectabilis dwyeri — Cogger, 2000; Parasuta dwyeri — Greer, 2006; Parasuta spectabilis dwyeri — Cogger, 2014; Suta dwyeri — Maryan et al., 2020

= Dwyer's snake =

Species of snake

Dwyer's snake (Suta dwyeri) also known as the variable black-naped snake, is a species of venomous snake in the family Elapidae. The species is endemic to Australia, where it is found from New South Wales to South Queensland. While closely related to Australian sea snakes, S. dwyeri is a terrestrial reptile.

== Etymology ==
The specific name, dwyeri, is in honor of Australian herpetologist John Dwyer.

== Taxonomy ==
There has been a great amount of instability of the nomenclature of many Australian snake taxa, particularly concerning the generic classification of the smaller Elapidae, some of which have been placed in several different genera in the span of just a few decades.

Accordingly, Dwyer's snake, which was originally named Denisonia dwyeri by Worrell in 1956, has been variously called Unechis dwyeri by Cogger in 1983, Suta dwyeri by Valentic in 1998, Suta spectabilis dwyeri by Cogger in 2000, and Parasuta dwyeri by Greer in 2006.

== Description ==
Adult S. dwyeri males average 31 cm (12 inches) in length from the tip of the snout to the uro-genital vent. Females are slightly smaller at around 29 cm (11 inches) in snout-to-vent length (SVL). S. dwyeri has a cylindrical brown body with a slender to medium build. The head is short and somewhat widened so as to be distinct from the neck. The tail is short as well, and the dorsal scales are smooth. The eye is medium-sized, with a vertically elliptical pupil.

== Reproduction ==
Breeders of exotic reptiles advise letting pairs of S. dwyeri mate when they reach a length of about 23 cm (9.1 in) for males and 22 cm (8.7 in) for females. This species is viviparous rather than egg laying and successfully births about three offspring per brood. Newborn S. dwyeri young are about 13 cm (5.1 in) long.

== Defense mechanisms ==
Like other snakes in the family Elapidae, S. dwyeri is venomous and has hollow fangs fixed at the front of the upper jaw. These fangs are connected via ducts to venom glands near the eyes. Like the majority of Australian elapids, Dwyer's snake is inoffensive and shy. In addition, herpetologists at the Queensland Museum describe Dwyer's snake as "weakly venomous", and do not include it among their list of eight snake species in the Brisbane area considered capable of inflicting potentially fatal bites. A 25-year-old man in Western Sydney mildly describes a snakebite from this species by saying that he was:

... bitten on the finger by a Suta dwyeri once. The bite did not hurt at all. But little did I know he had left his fang in my finger. A couple of days later it got a tiny bit infected and hurt for a couple of days ... nothing major though.

When threatened P. dwyeri prefers to coil into a tight ball as a defense mechanism for protection from larger predators. This enables the snake to protect its head and more vulnerable areas of its body.

== Behaviour and habitat ==
S. dwyeri is a secretive, nocturnal snake that seeks shelter under rocks, debris, and ground litter, and may make its home in burrows made and abandoned by other creatures. Open woodland, grassland, and rocky areas are its preferred natural habitats.

== Diet ==
S. dwyeri feeds mainly on small lizards such as geckos and skinks.

== Images ==
- Dwyer's snake
- Dwyer's snake
