= Ken Slater =

Ken Slater may refer to:

- Ken Slater (science fiction) (1917–2008), British science fiction fan and bookseller
- Ken Slater (sportsman) (1924–1963), Australian rules footballer and tennis player
- Ken Slater (herpetologist) (1923–1999), Australian engineer and herpetologist
