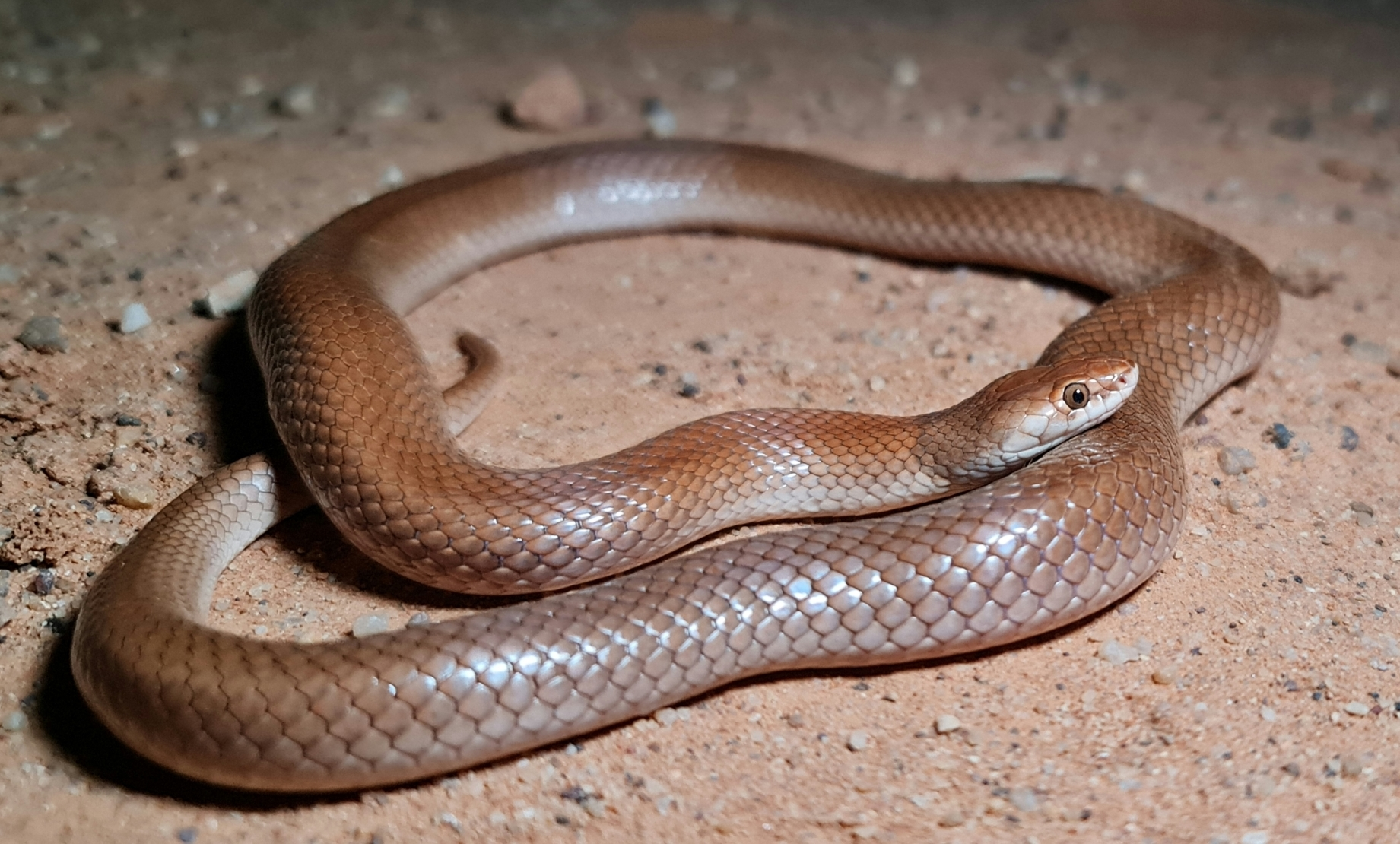

Conservation status
- Least Concern (IUCN 3.1)

Scientific classification
- Kingdom: Animalia
- Phylum: Chordata
- Class: Reptilia
- Order: Squamata
- Suborder: Serpentes
- Family: Elapidae
- Genus: Suta
- Species: S. suta

Binomial name
- Suta suta (W. Peters, 1863)
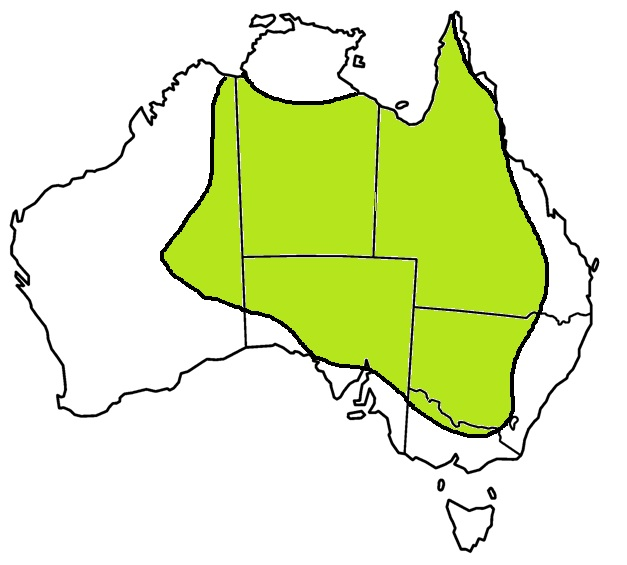
- Image depicting the range of the curl snake

Synonyms
- Hoplocephalus sutus W. Peters, 1863; Denisonia suta — Boulenger, 1896

= Curl snake =

Species of snake

The curl snake (Suta suta) is a species of venomous, heavily built snake in the family Elapidae. The species, which is native to Australia, is also known more commonly in Western Australia as the myall snake. The curl snake is often confused with a similar species named the Ord curl snake (Suta ordensis).

== Description ==
The typical length of the curl snake is 40 cm (16 in), although it has been known to reach lengths of 60 cm (24 in) or more. It has a wide head and is dark brown or reddish brown in colour, with a distinctively darker head and paler under the flanks. The light-coloured iris and small pupil are distinctive features of this species. S. suta also has a temporal dark-edged stripe (typically orange in colour) that extends around from each eye to the snout. Sometimes, the edges of the vertebral scales can be darker, resulting in a reticulated pattern from which the Latin name suta, meaning "stitched", is derived.

Scale count information for identification:

Dorsal scale rows at mid-body – 19 to 21, normally in 19 rows and rarely in 21
Ventrals – 150 to 170 with a single cloacal scale
Subcaudals – 20 to 35 single (undivided) scales

== Habitat/ecology and distribution ==
The curl snake can be found in all states and territories of Australia excluding Tasmania. It typically occurs in arid eastern and central Australia. In Victoria, it occurs only in the north and central regions, and in Western Australia, it is restricted to the far north-eastern boundaries. It most commonly inhabits grasslands, scrublands, and open woodlands, foraging amongst leaf litter and under rocks at night. It can be found occupying old burrows, in soil cracks, under woody debris, and under leaf litter.

The conservation status of this species is considered secure in all states except Victoria, where it is considered to be vulnerable. This species is a nocturnal forager and is threatened by the decline in ground cover across its habitats.

== Diet ==
The curl snake feeds mostly upon other small reptiles such as lizards, but also consumes small mammals and frogs to supplement its diet. Mammals may account for up to 20% of its dietary intake. The most commonly consumed reptiles include geckos, skinks, legless lizards, other snakes and dragons.

== Reproduction ==
S. suta is viviparous rather than oviparous, and bears live young in a typical litter of five. The litter size can range from one to seven. Hatchling length averages 15 cm.

== Behavior ==
The curl snake derives its common name from the characteristic defensive posture it assumes when threatened. It is known to curl up tightly into a spring-like coil, protecting its head. The defensive behaviour proceeding from this is usually a violent thrashing about.

== Toxicity ==
S. suta venom is neurotoxic and considered unsafe especially to small children. Bites from large specimens are considered especially dangerous. If bitten, one should seek medical advice immediately, immobilise the patient, and apply a pressure bandage.
