= Ken Slater (herpetologist) =

Australian engineer and herpetologist (1923–1999)

Kenneth R. Slater (22 June 1923 - 15 August 1999) was an Australian engineer and herpetologist. Slater's deliveries of snake venom were instrumental in the development of antivenom for several species.

== Biography ==
Slater was educated as a civil engineer, but he was interested in zoology and snakes, as well. In his early years, he accompanied Eric Worrell a few times, searching for live snakes in the Australian wild. In 1952, he took a job in the oil industry in Papua New Guinea, to be able to spend more time in the wild. Shortly after, he was appointed acting animal ecologist by the Department of Agriculture of the PNG government. Just over a year after returning to Australia, Slater was appointed senior wildlife officer for South Australia in 1960, followed by a position as acting wildlife biologist for the Northern Territory Administration in 1963. He also worked some time for Worrell's Australian Reptile Park, caring for, and milking, snakes for just under a year (1959-1960).

=== Snake venom ===
Slater was an experienced snake collector and snake milker. In his Papua New Guinea years, he supplied the Commonwealth Serum Laboratories (CSL) with their first samples of Papuan taipan venom. He also provided all the Papuan black snake venom CSL used to develop and produce an antivenom for the species. This antivenom turned out to be effective for bites of the king brown snake, as well. In 1955, CSL provided Slater, Worrell, and Ram Chandra with some of the first doses of Taipan antivenom, in recognition of the dangers involved in their work.

== Taxonomy ==
Slater described Oxyuranus scutellatus canni, commonly known as the coastal or Papuan taipan, in 1956. He named it after George Cann, longtime Snake Man of La Perouse.

Slater is commemorated in the scientific name of a species of Australian lizard, Liopholis slateri.

== Bibliography ==
- (1956). A Guide to the Snakes of Papua.
- (1968). A Guide to the Dangerous Snakes of Papua. 22 pp. ASIN B0007JRJQ2.
