= Taicatoxin =

Snake toxin

Taicatoxin (TCX) is a snake toxin that blocks voltage-dependent L-type calcium channels and small conductance Ca^{2+}-activated K^{+} channels. The name taicatoxin (TAIpan + CAlcium + TOXIN) is derived from its natural source, the taipan snake, the site of its action, calcium channels, and from its function as a toxin. Taicatoxin was isolated from the venom of Australian taipan snake, Oxyuranus scutellatus scutellatus. TCX is a secreted protein, produced in the venom gland of the snake.

== Chemistry ==
Through SDS-PAGE analysis, TCX (112154-17-3 ) was determined to be a complex held together by non-covalent forces of the following three polypeptides in a stoichiometry of 1:1:4 respectively:

- a α-neurotoxin-like peptide (8 kDa),
- a neurotoxic phospholipase (16 kDa;) and
- a serine protease inhibitor (7 kDa;).

The active complex was isolated by ion exchange chromatography through DE-Cellulose and two steps of Cm-Cellulose chromatography at pH = 4.7 and pH = 6.0, respectively. It migrates in beta-alanine-acetate-urea gel electrophoresis as a single compound. The phospholipase activity can be separated by affinity chromatography, using a phospholipid analog (PC-Sepharose). The alpha-neurotoxin-like peptide can be separated from the protease inhibitor, Sephadex G-50 gel filtration chromatography can be used, in the presence of high salt (1M NaCl) and alkaline conditions (pH = 8.2). The amino sequence of the protease inhibitor was determined by using the automatic Edman degradation method.

== Target ==
Taicatoxin acts on the voltage-dependent L-type calcium channels from the heart, and on the small conductance Ca^{2+}-activated K^{+} channels in the chromaffin cells and in the brain. It has a high affinity for the ^{125}I-apamin acceptor-binding sites of the rat synaptosomal membranes (K_{i} = 1.45±0.22 nM) and blocks affinity-labeling of a 33-kDa ^{125}I-apamin-binding polypeptide. Other neurotoxins that act on the calcium channels are calcicludine, calciseptine, ω-conotoxin, ω-agatoxin.

== Mode of action ==
It lowers the plateau of the action potential, decreasing the duration and the concentration parameters in the heart muscle cells. It has been seen that the 16-kDa subunit exhibits phospholipase activity, inducing a release of acyl CoA and acyl carnitine, fact which has a negative effect on cell's integrity and function. TCX is involved in the outer hair cell motility too, by blocking the calcium traffic and preventing the cell shortening and elongation. Taicatoxin has an inhibitory effect by reducing the affinity of ^{125}I-apamin for its acceptor and not by alteration of the acceptor binding site density.

== Toxicity ==
A dose of 1 to 2 μg of taicatoxin can kill a mouse of 20 g in 2 hours. Pretreatment with taicatoxin (0.19 μM) on the outer hair cells of guinea pig prevented the cell shortening induced by high K^{+} (50 mM) and the cell elongation induced by ionomycine (10 μM). This is because taicatoxin blocks the calcium influx through the calcium channels in the cell's membrane. 50 nM of taicatoxin blocks the apamin-sensitive after-hyperpolarizing slow tail K^{+} currents in rat chromaffin cells, but not immediately; instead, 5 μM of this toxin immediately blocks the I_{SK(Ca)} tail current. It has been shown that taicatoxin blocks the calcium currents in heart cells with IC_{50} between 10 and 500 nM. Also was seen to evoke severe arrhythmias and prolonged changes in the intercellular electrical coupling.
