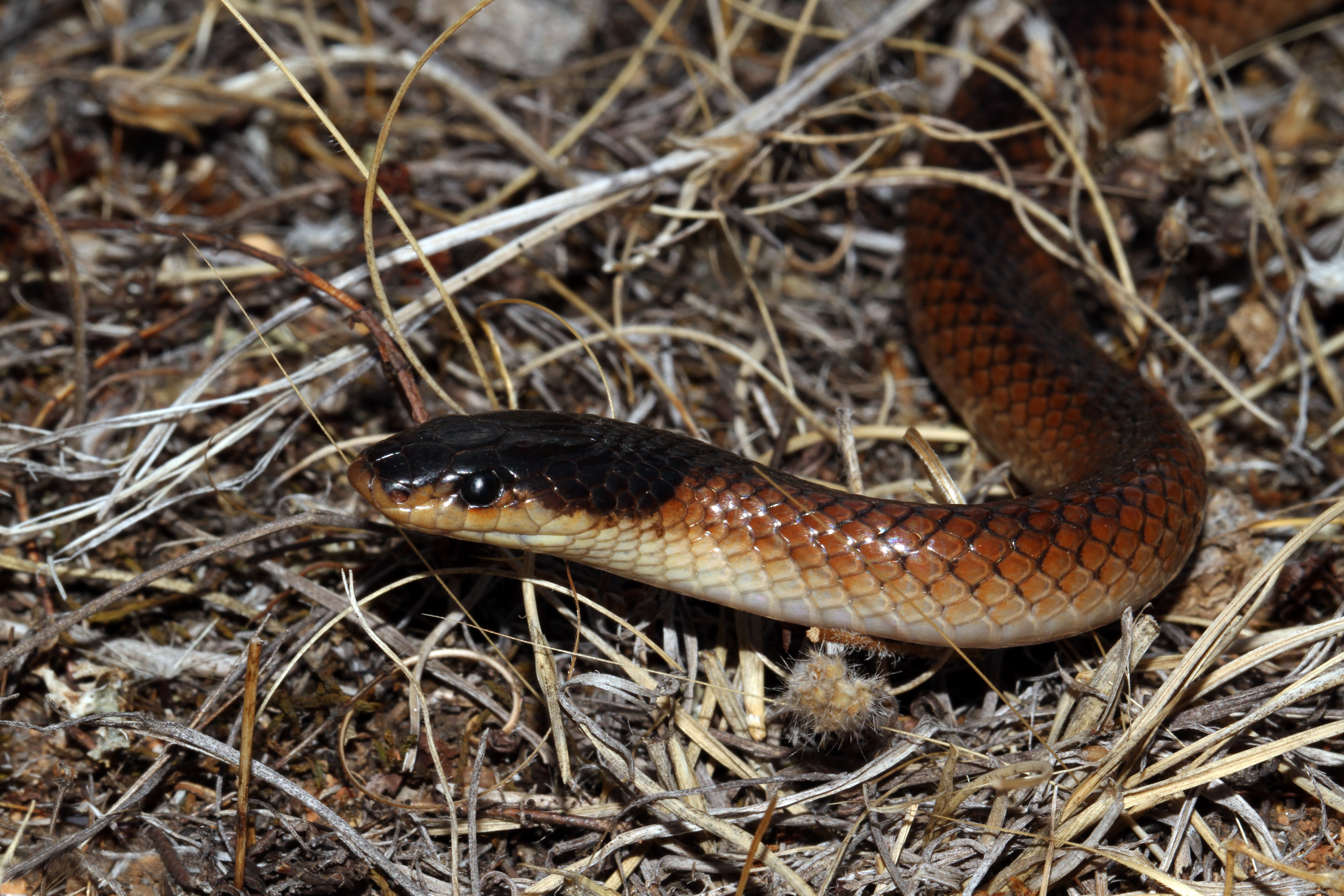

Conservation status
- Least Concern (IUCN 3.1)

Scientific classification
- Kingdom: Animalia
- Phylum: Chordata
- Class: Reptilia
- Order: Squamata
- Suborder: Serpentes
- Family: Elapidae
- Genus: Suta
- Species: S. nigriceps

Binomial name
- Suta nigriceps (Günther, 1863)
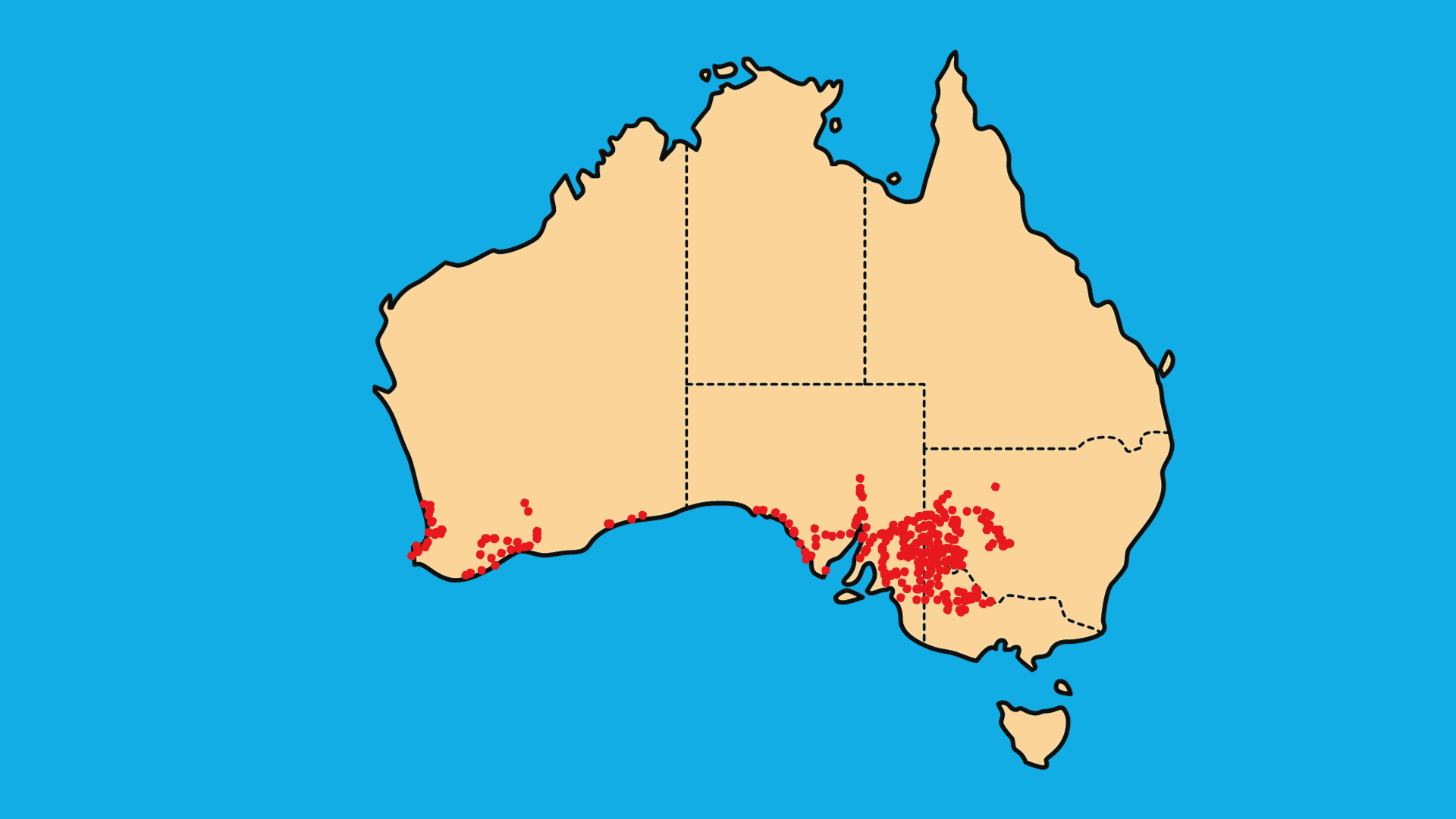

Synonyms
- Hoplocephalus nigriceps Günther, 1863; Denisonia nigrostriata brevicauda Mitchell, 1951; Unechis brevicaudus — Cogger, 1975; Denisonia nigriceps — Storr, 1981; Unechis nigriceps — Mengden, 1983; Rhinoplocephalus nigriceps — Storr, 1984; Suta nigriceps — Hutchinson, 1990; Parasuta nigriceps — Greer, 2006; Suta nigriceps — Maryan, 2020

= Mallee black-backed snake =

Species of snake

The Mallee black-backed snake (Suta nigriceps) also known as the Mitchell's short-tailed snake or more commonly as the black-backed snake, is a species of venomous snake from the family Elapidae. This species is native to Australia and is found in a variety of habitats in southern mainland Australia.

== Description ==
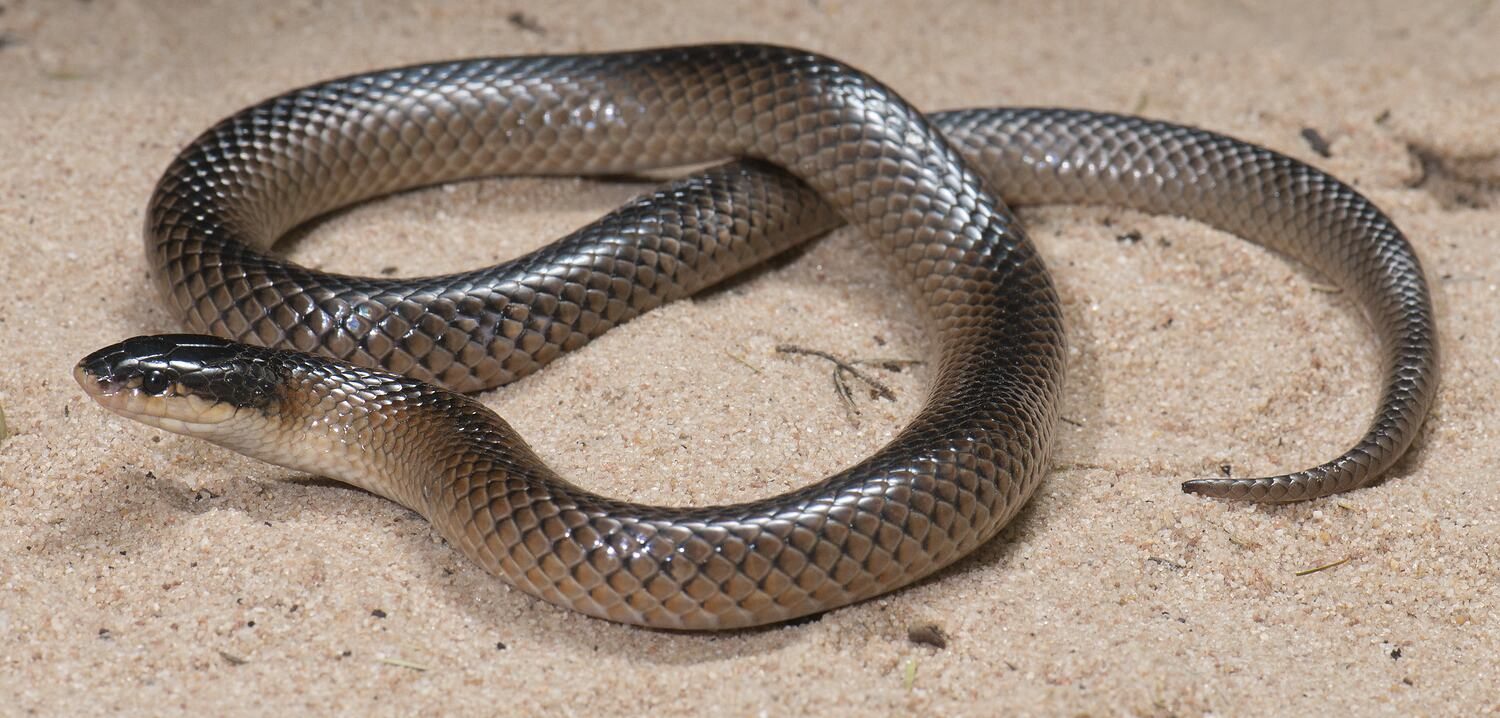
Mallee black-backed snake (Suta nigriceps)

Mallee black-backed snakes measure from 16 to 53 cm, with an average snout-vent length (SVL) of about 33 cm and a tail length between 9 and 15% SVL.

The head and the nape are a glossy black color with a continuous, broad black vertebral stripe along the back, about five scales wide that extend to the tail.

The lateral scales are pale brown with a black or reddish-brown base and the lips and the ventral surface are cream or white. The scale color deepens towards the vertebral stripe along the back of the snake, creating a blending effect. This species has smooth scales in 15 rows at mid-body, ventral scales ranging from 147-175 and subcaudal scales ranging between 18-35.

== Taxonomy ==
Albert Günther provided the first description for this species as Hoplochephalus nigriceps in 1863. The Mallee black-backed snake belongs to the genus Suta. These are venomous snakes that are endemic to mainland Australia from the family Elapidae. Elapids are characterized by their permanently erect fangs at the front of their mouth.

The Mallee black-backed snake is also recognized as part of the morphologically conservative genus Parasuta, which comprises small, nocturnal, viviparous snakes with glossy body scales that are mostly confined to the drier regions of southern Australia.

The generic classification of smaller elapids has varied immensely in recent history which has led to many species being placed in different genera. This has been evident for the Mallee black-backed snake, particularly during the past 50 years.

== Distribution and habitat ==
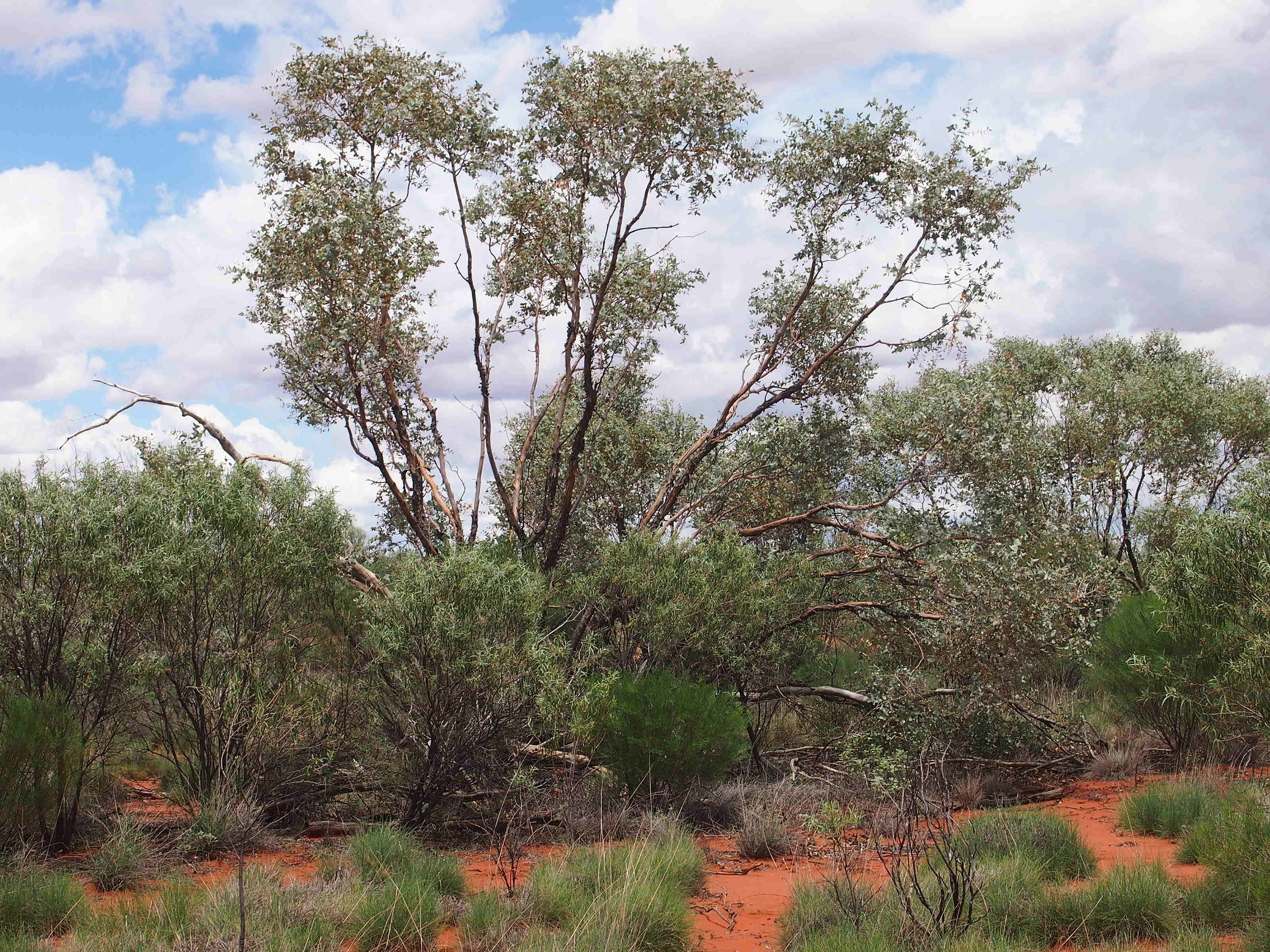
Habitat example for the Mallee black-backed snake.

Mallee black-backed snakes are found throughout southern mainland Australia across New South Wales, South Australia, Victoria and Western Australia.

The species is widespread and is one of the most common snakes in southern Australia, found in coastal dune, heath, and semi-arid habitats including mallee, banksia and jarrah woodlands.

Mallee black-backed snakes preferred habitats are temperate semi-arid plains, slopes and ranges in woodlands and hummock grasslands.

== Behavior and diet ==
Mallee black-backed snakes are a nocturnal, terrestrial (ground-dwelling) species, described as docile. Within their environment, the species takes shelter under fallen timber, rocks, deep leaf litter, in soil cracks and abandoned animal burrows.

Mallee black-backed snakes are carnivores and tend to feed on small skinks and geckos at night. They are also known to hunt other small snakes who compete for similar prey, small mammals and frogs and have been known to hunt their species.

When killing their prey, elapids use venom and constriction, holding onto their victims for a short period after striking to ensure enough venom enters the prey. This is because their fangs are shorter and do not deliver venom as efficiently as viperids.

== Reproduction ==
Mallee black-backed snakes are viviparous, meaning they give birth to their young, rather than producing eggs. The average litter size is four, but females are known to give birth to seven live young.

Snakes are not viviparous in the mammalian sense, as the embryo is nourished by yolk, not the bloodstream of the female parent and for this reason, the live-bearing method is sometimes referred to as ovoviviparous.

== Predators and threats ==
Predation from larger snake species and other Mallee black-backed snakes is common, however, birds and feral cats and dogs may also prey on this native species.

Mallee Black-backed Snakes are vulnerable to predators due to their small size. To protect themselves, they take cover inside fallen timber and abandoned burrows, as their coloring helps them camouflage.

Mallee black-backed snakes suffer from habitat loss, fragmentation and degradation caused by urbanization within localized habitats, however, this is not a major concern for population numbers. They are also susceptible to the impacts of habitat destruction from introduced species, such as cattle.

== Conservation ==
The Mallee black-backed snake is classified as Least Concern on the IUCN Red List of Threatened Species. There are no national or state-based conservation plans in place for this species.
