= John Cann (athlete) =

Australian athlete

Personal information
- Nationality: Australian
- Born: 15 January 1938 (age 88) Sydney, Australia
- Height: 185 cm (6 ft 1 in)
- Weight: 82 kg (181 lb)

Sport
- Sport: Athletics, rugby league
- Event: Decathlon

John Cann (born 15 January 1938) is an Australian athlete. He held an Australian record in hurdles as well as New South Wales state records in hurdles, discus and javelin. He was described in The Canberra Times in 1957 as one of Australia's best all-round athletes. He represented Australia in the 1956 Summer Olympic Games in Melbourne finishing 10th in the decathlon.

He also played rugby league for New South Wales Country Firsts (1959) and for the New South Wales state team (1960).

He devoted his post-athletic career to exhibiting and studying snakes and writing several books and lecturing about them. He became known as the Snake Man of La Perouse (a suburb of Sydney). In a YouTube video titled The Snakeman of La Perouse he reflects on his near-lifetime involvement with snakes, other reptiles and turtles. In 2018 he published an as-told-to autobiography titled John Cann - The Last Snake Man.
