= Suta gaikhorstorum =

Scientific classification
- Kingdom: Animalia
- Phylum: Chordata
- Class: Reptilia
- Order: Squamata
- Suborder: Serpentes
- Family: Elapidae
- Genus: Suta
- Species: S. gaikhorstorum

Binomial name
- Suta gaikhorstorum Maryan, Brennan, Hutchinson & Geidans, 2020

Species of Australian snake

Suta gaikhorstorum, also known as the Pilbara hooded snake, is a species of venomous snake that is endemic to Australia. The specific epithet gaikhorstorum honours naturalists Klaas and Mieke Gaikhorst of the Armadale Reptile & Wildlife Centre.

== Description ==
The species grows to an average of about 35–36 cm in length, occasionally up to 46 cm. Body colouration is mainly a light to rich reddish-brown with a dark grey to black hood.

== Distribution and habitat ==
The species is found in the Pilbara region of Western Australia, especially in the Hamersley Range. It occurs in heavy, often stony, soils in mulga and eucalypt woodlands with a Triodia understorey. The type locality is 5 km south of the Mount Tom Price mine.
