= Snake Bitten =

Book by Kevin Markwell and Nancy Cushing

- Author: Kevin Markwell and Nancy Cushing
- Subject: Biography
- Publisher: Sydney: UNSW Press
- Publication date: October 2010
- Publication place: Australia
- ISBN: 978-1-74223-232-4

Snake Bitten is a book written by Kevin Markwell and Nancy Cushing. The book, with interviews from staff and supporters, is a biography of Eric Worrell who established the Australian Reptile Park in 1959.
