= Kevin Budden =

Australian herpetologist (1930–1950)

Kevin Clifford Budden (27 September 1930 – 28 July 1950) was an amateur Australian herpetologist and snake hunter. Budden was the first person to capture a live taipan for research and died from a snakebite in the process of doing so. His work was instrumental in developing a taipan antivenom.

== Early life ==
After leaving school, Budden worked as a retail assistant in Randwick, New South Wales. At that time he joined the Australian Reptile Club and began hunting snakes as a hobby. He built a snake pit and spent weekends in the bush collecting snakes. In 1948, he caught 59 snakes and was bitten five times.

== Taipan capture and death ==
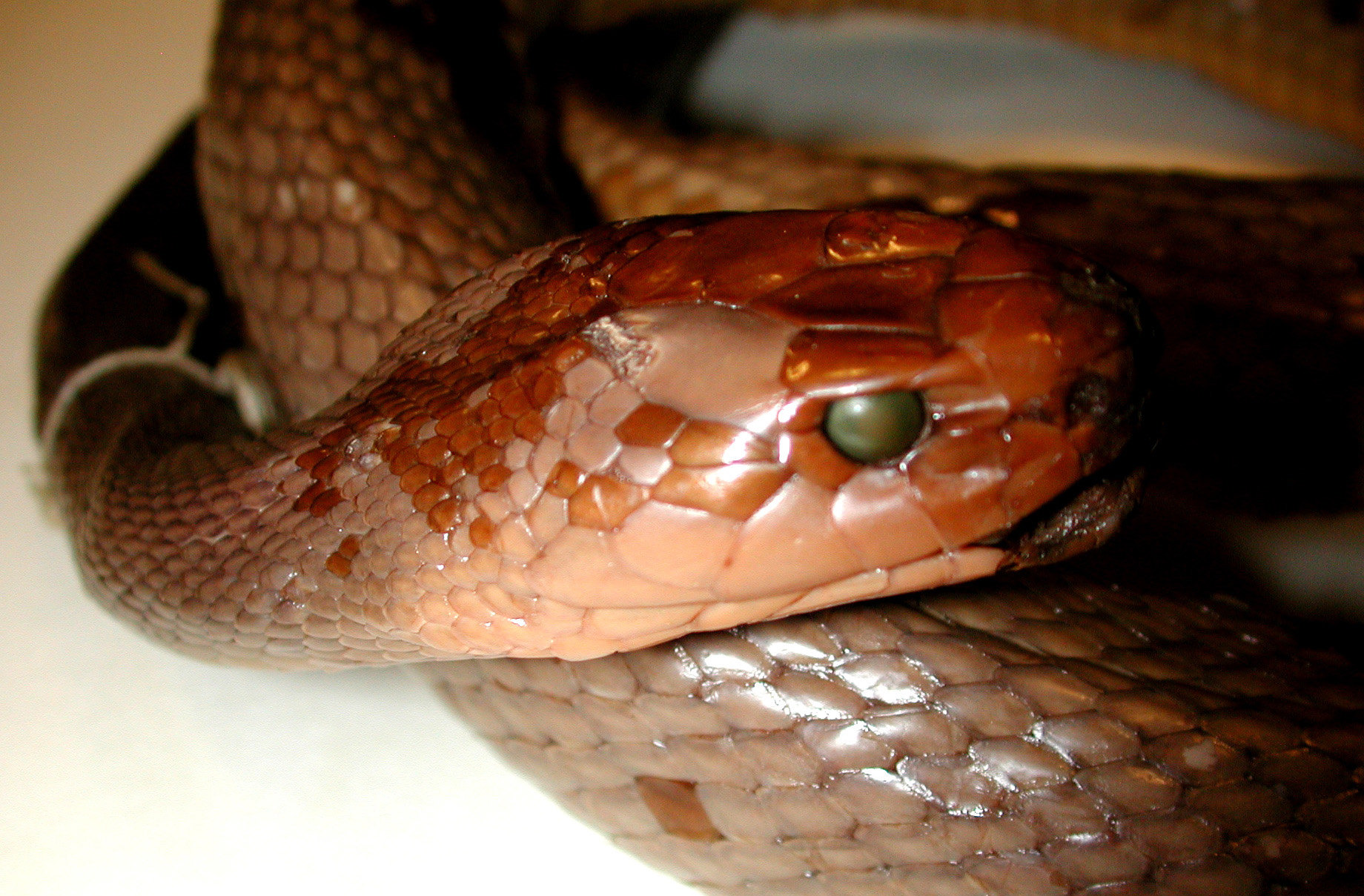
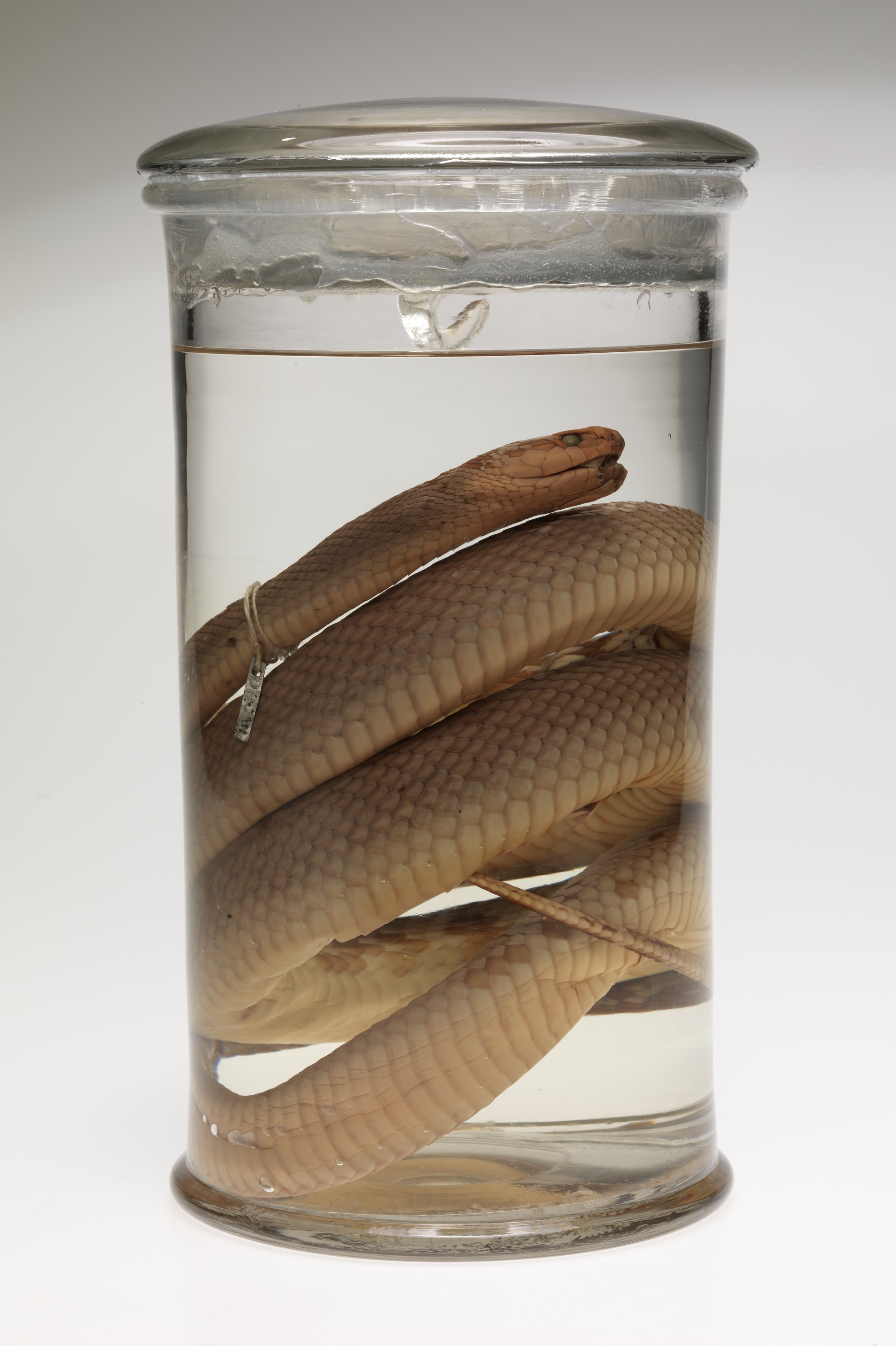
The specimen captured by Budden in 1950, from whose venom the first taipan antivenom was made. Currently preserved in spirits and stored in the collections of Museums Victoria.

In March 1950, Budden travelled to Queensland with two colleagues to capture a taipan for antivenom research. The group had previously visited Cape York and the Northern Territory on a similar quest. On 27 July, Budden captured a 6-foot (1.8 m) taipan near Cairns. He carried the snake by hand, caught a ride from a passing truck, and took the snake to another local snake catcher, where it was identified as a taipan. While attempting to bag the snake, Budden was bitten on his left thumb but successfully placed the captured snake in a bag. Extracting a promise from the truck driver that he would get the snake to someone who would transport it south to researchers, Budden was taken for medical treatment. Not having any antivenom for taipans, Budden was given tiger snake antivenom. Although that helped counter the coagulating effect of taipan venom, it did not overcome the second effect of the taipan venom, which paralysis the nervous system. Though doctors initially hoped he would recover, he died the following afternoon. The snake, believed to be a coastal taipan, died on 12 September 1950.

== Legacy ==
At the time of Budden's death, there were various rumours about the taipan, but it was not until Budden had captured this specimen that serious consideration was given to the potency of its venom. Two prior taipan specimens had been obtained in 1923, but those snakes were dead, and venom samples were contaminated.

Budden's captured snake was sent alive to the Commonwealth Research Laboratories in Melbourne, where its venom was successfully milked by zoologist David Fleay, who was at that time the director of Healesville Sanctuary. Venom from the captured taipan was instrumental in researching and developing an antivenom, which became available in 1955, and saved the life of an 11-year-old Cairns boy before the year was over. The story of Budden and his sacrifice spurred efforts to capture other snakes and produce more antivenoms, including brown snake in 1956, death adder in 1958, Papuan black snake in 1961, sea snake in 1962, and polyvalent snake antivenom in 1962.

In a 2014 article published in the Journal of Proteomics, University of Queensland, a venomologist, Bryan Fry reported finding specimens of the venom harvested from the taipan that killed Budden. His study found that the venom had retained its toxicity after almost sixty years in dry storage.
