= Ram Chandra (snake showman) =

Australian snake showman

Ram Chandra OAM BEM (given name: Edward Royce Ramsamy) was a snake showman in Australia. He was known as Australia's "taipan man" and for his work in extracting snake venom to create antivenoms.

He was born on 24 May 1921 and joined the show circuit in Sydney in the early 1940s. He handled and demonstrated various snakes in "The Pit of Death" and in 1946 changed his name to Ram Chandra. He was responsible for the identification of the taipan as a separate species from the brown snake. In 1951 he successfully milked a taipan, and in 1955 he attempted to make his own antivenom, unsuccessfully experimenting on a kangaroo rat. Following this, his doctor, Dr Chenoweth, arranged for venom Chandra had milked to be freeze-dried and sent to the Commonwealth Serum Laboratories. By mid 1955, CSL had made an antivenom available, and it saved the life of Bruce Stringer, a Cairns schoolboy. The following year, Ram Chandra was himself saved from a taipan bite. In 1975 he was awarded a British Empire Medal in the Queen's Birthday Honours. He died in Mackay on 31 July 1998.

He was featured in the Magnificent Makers exhibition at the State Library of Queensland in 2018.
