= Ord curl snake =

Conservation status
- Least Concern (IUCN 3.1)

Scientific classification
- Kingdom: Animalia
- Phylum: Chordata
- Class: Reptilia
- Order: Squamata
- Suborder: Serpentes
- Family: Elapidae
- Genus: Suta
- Species: S. ordensis

Binomial name
- Suta ordensis (Storr, 1984)

Synonyms
- Denisonia ordensis Storr, 1984

Species of snake

The Ord curl snake (Suta ordensis) is a species of snake in the family Elapidae. It is endemic to Australia and native to the catchments of Ord and Victoria Rivers in the northern borderland region between Northern Territory and Western Australia. It occurs in tropical, seasonally dry woodlands and grasslands.

Ord curl snake is mildly venomous.
