= Eric Worrell =

Australian herpetologist

Eric Worrell MBE
- Born: 27 October 1924; Granville, New South Wales, Australia
- Died: 13 July 1987 (aged 62); Wyoming, New South Wales, Australian
- Occupations: Herpetologist, science writer, zoo founder and proprietor
- Known for: Founder of Eric Worrell's Australian Reptile Park

Eric Arthur Frederic Worrell, MBE (27 October 1924 – 13 July 1987) was an Australian herpetologist, naturalist, science writer and zoo founder and director, known for establishing the Australian Reptile Park at Wyoming on the NSW Central Coast in 1959.

Worrell's collection of snake venom was utilised by the Australian Serum Laboratories as essential in the production of snake anti-venom in Australia.

== Early life ==
Worrell was born at Granville, New South Wales the son of salesman and taxidriver (Charles) Percy Frederic Worrell and his wife Rita Mary Ann Worrell (née Rochester). Eric was educated at Glenmore Road Public School in Paddington then Sydney Boys High School. By the age of 10 he was keenly interested in wildlife, keeping reptiles and other animals at home (first at Paddington then around 1938, to Cecily Street, Lilyfield). He was encouraged in his hobby by his parents and by George Cann, the "Snake Man of La Perouse", and latterly Keeper of Reptiles at Taronga Park Zoo.

He left school at 13 and spent several years in work gangs in regional New South Wales and Queensland, studying drawing and photography in his spare time. During the Second World War he worked as a civilian blacksmith on the installation of shore artillery in Darwin and other work at Katherine, where he had many opportunities to study the local wildlife. After the war he and his friend, the poet Roland Robinson returned to the Northern Territory in 1946, collecting specimens for zoos and museums, and writing articles on Territory wildlife for magazines such as Walkabout.

== Wildlife career ==
Worrell opened the Ocean Beach Aquarium in 1950 at Umina Beach on the New South Wales Central Coast. It was here in 1951 that he first started supplying tiger snake venom to the Commonwealth Serum Laboratories (CSL) in Melbourne. Taipan venom followed in 1952. He later expanded his repertoire to include spiders such as the Sydney funnel-web spider and exotic snakes. In 1955 CSL provided Worrell, together with Ken Slater and Ram Chandra with some of the first doses of Taipan antivenom, in recognition of the dangers involved in their work.

Worrell purchased land at Wyoming, New South Wales in 1958 establishing the Australian Reptile Park, which opened in October 1959, with a large number of exotic as well as Australian animals. In 1963, he had a giant dinosaur statue erected at its entrance as a tourist drawcard, one of Australia's first "Big Things".

== Personal life and later life ==
Worrell married Carol Renee Hawkins, a shop assistant, on 31 July 1948 and had three children. They divorced in 1971, and he remarried to Robyn Beverley Innes on 16 June 1973, who was his secretary, they divorced in 1985.

Among his friends were the naturalist Vincent Serventy, zoologist Jock Marshall, photographer Jeff Carter and artist Russell Drysdale.

In his later years, he was beset with personal, health, and financial problems and tried to sell the Reptile Park in 1985, however he was given a lifeline when entertainer Bobby Limb and local businessman Ed Manners bailed him out of his financial difficulties.

Worrell died of a heart attack at his home within the grounds of the Reptile Park on 13 July 1987. After his death the park was relocated to Somersby, New South Wales

== Recognition ==
- A 1964 sketch portrait of Worrell, "The Snake Man" by Russell Drysdale, is held by the National Gallery of Australia
- In 1970 Worrell received an MBE in recognition of his lifesaving role in the development of snake anti-venoms. In the same year the ARP began supplying funnel-web spider venom to the CSL in the process of developing an anti-venom.
- He and Robyn received the National Australia Bank's humanitarian award for their contribution to the development of an antivenene for the Sydney funnel-web spider in 1981.
- Snake Bitten, a book about Worrell, was published in 2010.

== Bibliography ==
Apart from numerous scientific papers and popular natural history articles in Walkabout, Wildlife, Australian Outdoors, Pix and People Magazine, books authored, coauthored or contributed to by Worrell include:

- 1952 – Dangerous Snakes of Australia (Angus and Robertson). (2nd edition 1953; 3rd edition, 1957. (Some or all of these editions are undated but Worrell states that the 1st edition was published in 1952 in the first printing of Dangerous Snakes of Australia and New Guinea; see next entry)).
- 1961 – Dangerous Snakes of Australia and New Guinea. (Angus and Robertson). (Described by Worrell as the 4th edition; 5th edition,1963, reprinted 1966; 6th edition, 1969).
- 1958 – Song of the Snake. (Angus and Robertson)
- 1962 – Australian Reptile Park (A.R.P.). (Angus and Robertson)
- 1964 – Reptiles of Australia. (Angus and Robertson)
- 1966 – Australian Wildlife. (Angus and Robertson)
- 1966 – Australian Snakes, Crocodiles and Tortoises. (Angus and Robertson)
- 1966 – The Great Barrier Reef. (Angus and Robertson)
- 1966 – The Great Extermination. (part author) – (Heinemenn) by Alan Moorhead
- 1967 – Trees of the Australian Bush. (co-author with Lois Sourry) (Angus and Robertson)
- 1968 – Making Friends with Animals. (Angus and Robertson)
- 1970 – Australian Birds and Animals. (Angus and Robertson)
- 1977 – Things that Sting. (Angus and Robertson)
