= Snake Man of La Perouse =

Sydney reptile show

Coordinates: 33.9881°S 151.2339°E

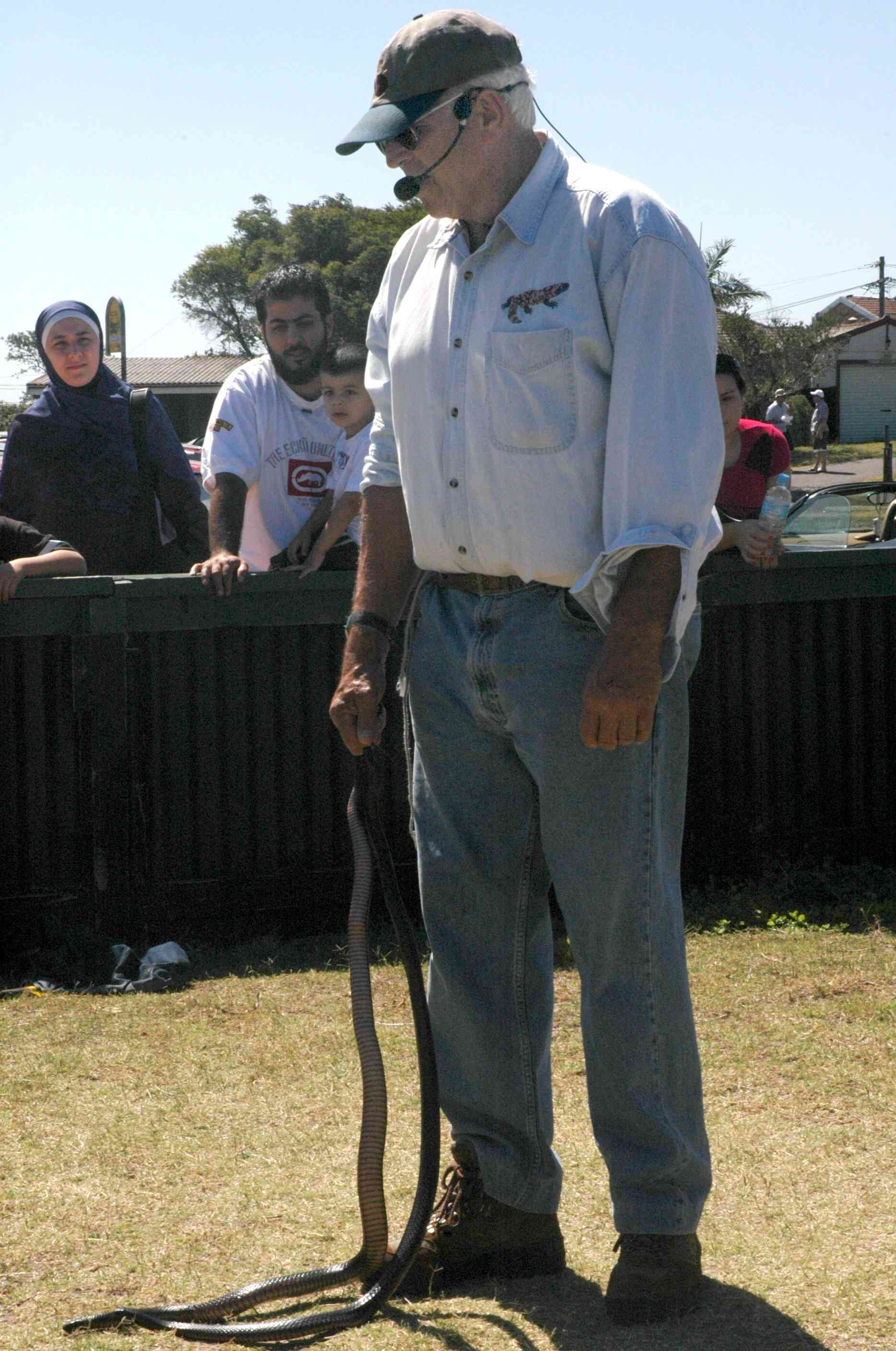
- Snake Man performance, January 2007
- Formation: Early 1900s
- Type: Theatre group
- Purpose: Reptile show
- Location: La Perouse, NSW, Australia
- Notable members: "Professor" Fred Fox; George Cann Sr. George Cann Jr. John Cann
- Website: laperouse.info

The Snake Man is the common name for a reptile show at La Perouse, a suburb of Sydney, Australia. It was also known as "the snake pit", and an occasional Sunday afternoon visit to the Snake Man was a tradition for generations of Sydney families.

== History ==
The show was held on the same site in La Perouse since the early 20th century.

=== "Professor" Frederick Fox ===
The original Snake Man was "Professor" Frederick Fox, also known as the "Snake King", who was proud of the immunity to snake venom that he had developed. However, like other such showmen, he did have his own special antidote.

In 1913, Fox travelled to India to sell his antidote.

While demonstrating his antidote in Calcutta in 1914, Fox was bitten several times by a krait. He treated himself but overlooked one bite and died after a few hours.

=== Herbert See ===
Another local, Herbert See, took over the La Perouse show but he was bitten by an eastern brown snake and died in hospital.

=== George Cann ===
George Cann took on the show in the 1919 and the Cann family ran the show thereafter. Snake bites were an ongoing hazard.

John Cann was awarded an OAM in 1992 for service to the community, conservation and the environment. The area surrounding the snake pit has been named Cann Park. The last snake man, John Cann, indicated in 2010 that he was soon to retire. His last show was held on 18 April 2010. The 7.30 Report broadcast a story on Cann on 13 April 2010.

=== Hawkesbury Herpetological Society ===
Since John Cann's retirement in 2010, the Hawkesbury Herpetological Society has been conducting the shows every weekend. John Cann is still an active member of the Society, of which he is the patron.

In November 2012 it was announced that the La Perouse Museum would include a permanent exhibition to recognise the Cann family.

In 2014, the snake pit was damaged by vandals.

== Show ==
The Snake Man performed in a 13-by-7-metre (43 ft × 23 ft) area of grass defined by a metre-high corrugated steel fence. He stood in the "pit" and removed reptiles one by one from canvas bags to show them to people lining the fence. He held a snake by the tail as he talked about it, or he may have walked around the perimeter of the pit with the reptile just centimetres from the onlookers.

Often he allowed a harmless reptile, such as an Australian water dragon, to roam the pit for the duration of the show.

At the conclusion of each half-hour show "the hat" was passed around for a small donation. The show was usually at 1.30 pm on Sundays.

== Gallery ==
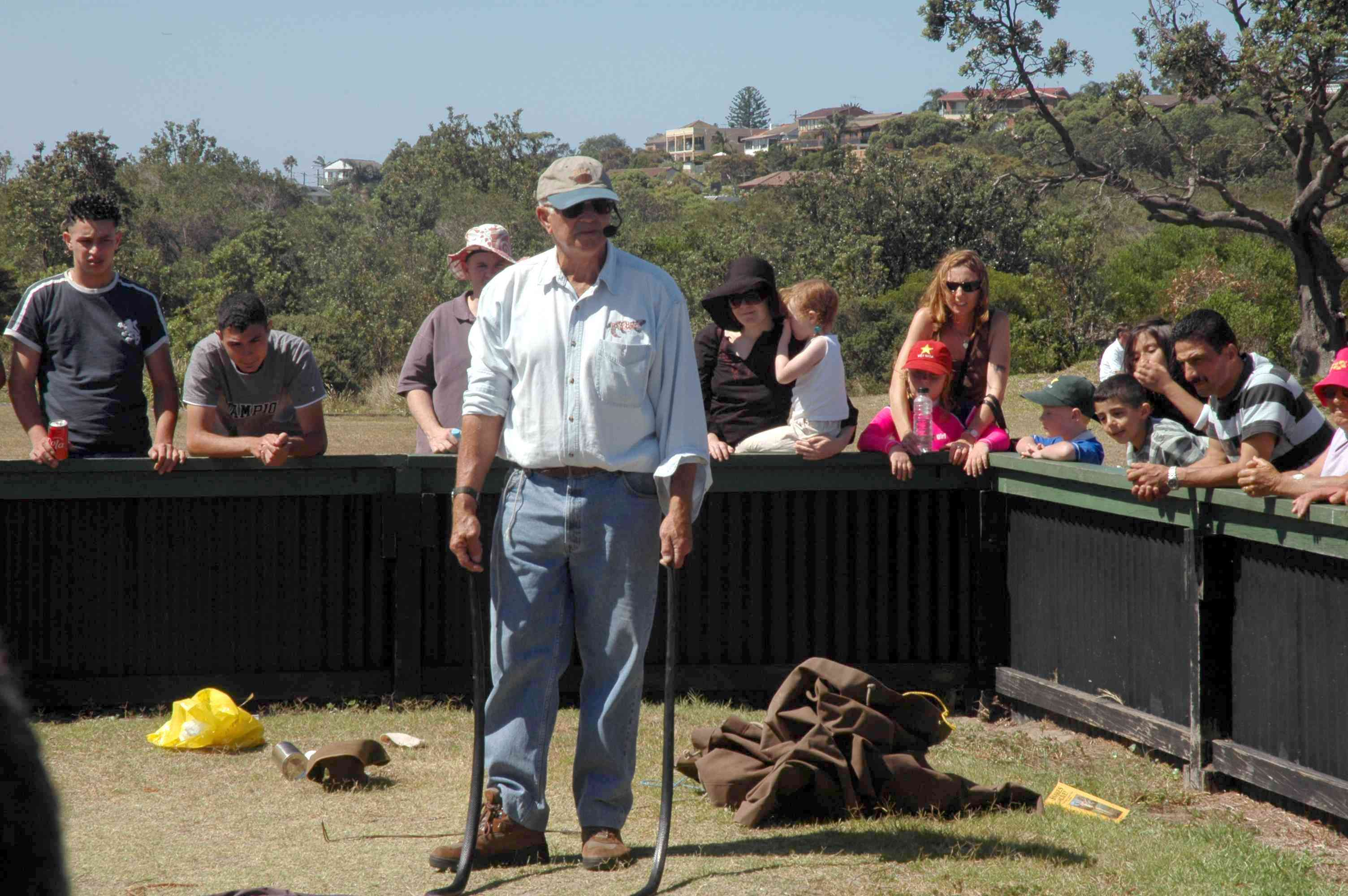
The Snake Man of La Perouse

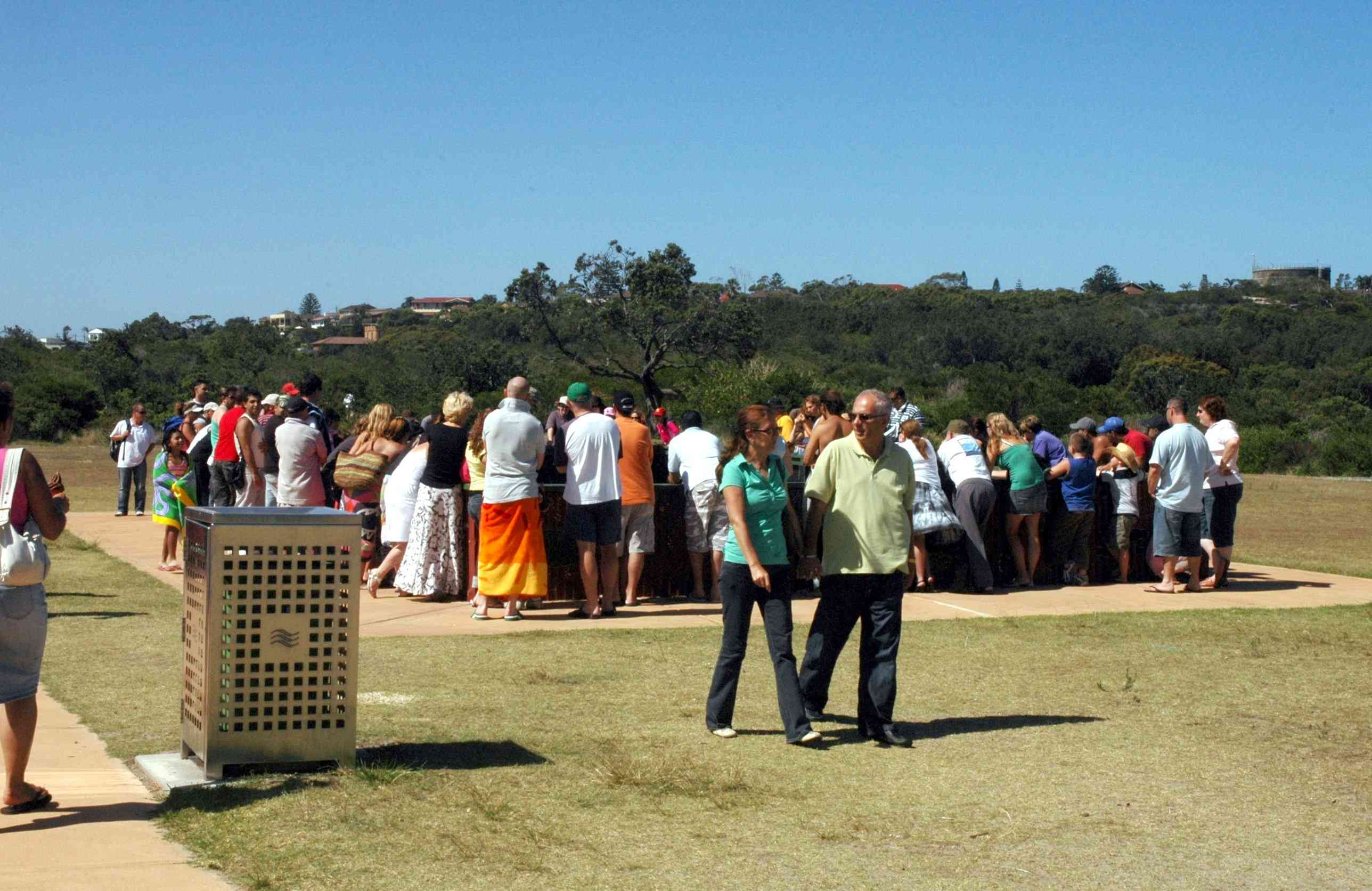
The Snake Pit, La Perouse, on a Sunday afternoon

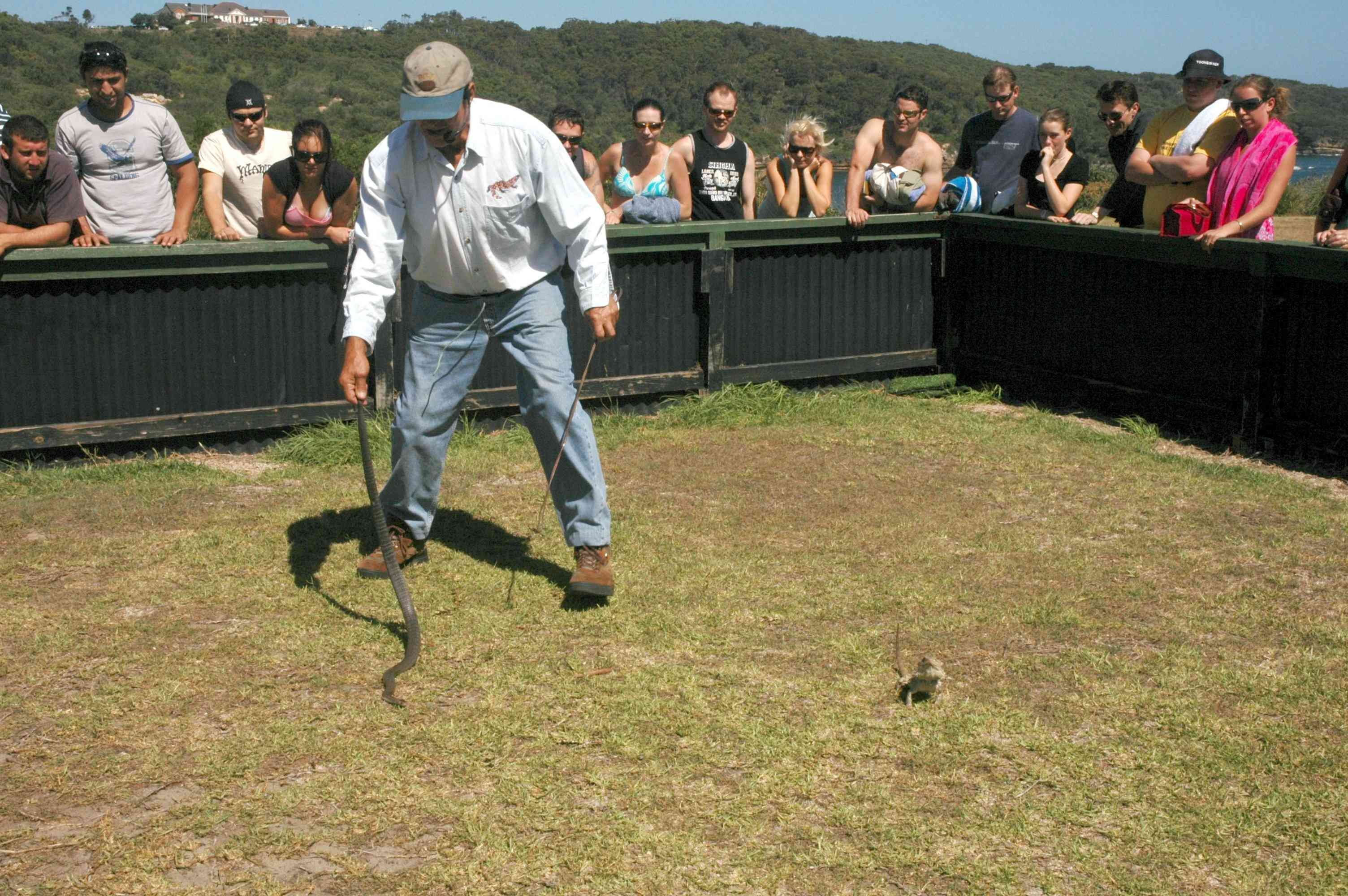
The Snake Man of La Perouse in action

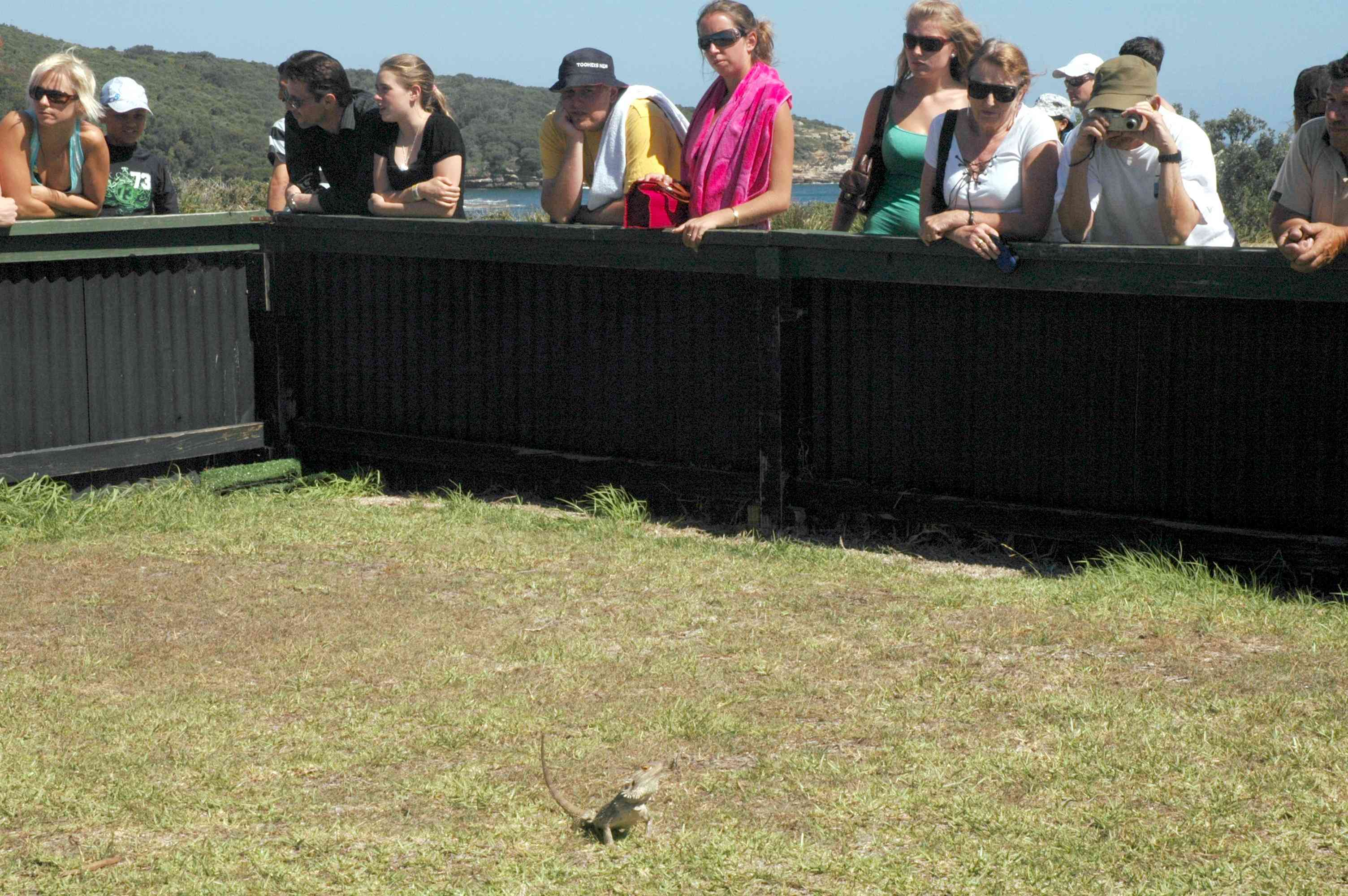
The audience watches the show while a bearded dragon roams the enclosure

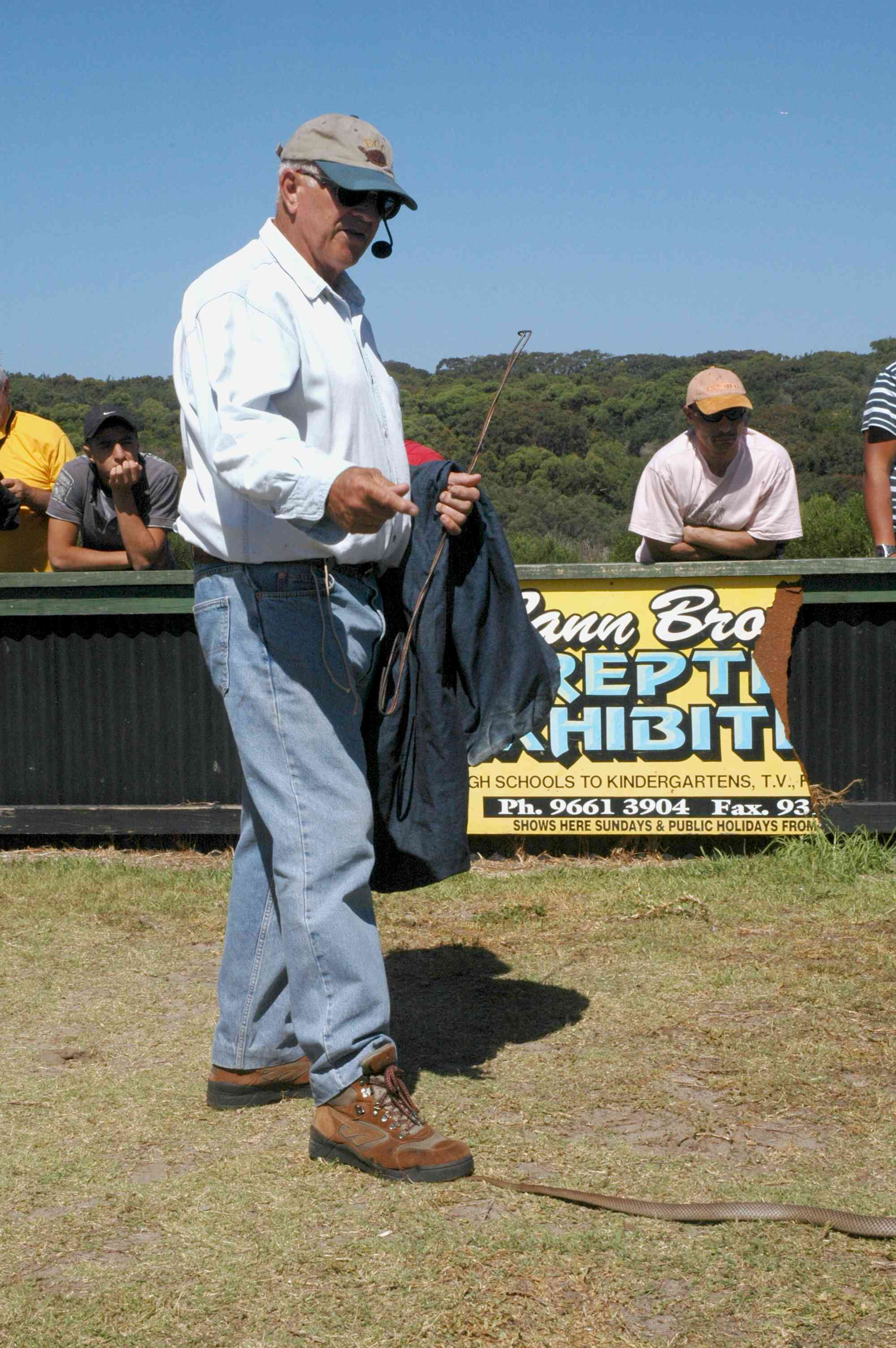
The snake man holds back a snake with his foot

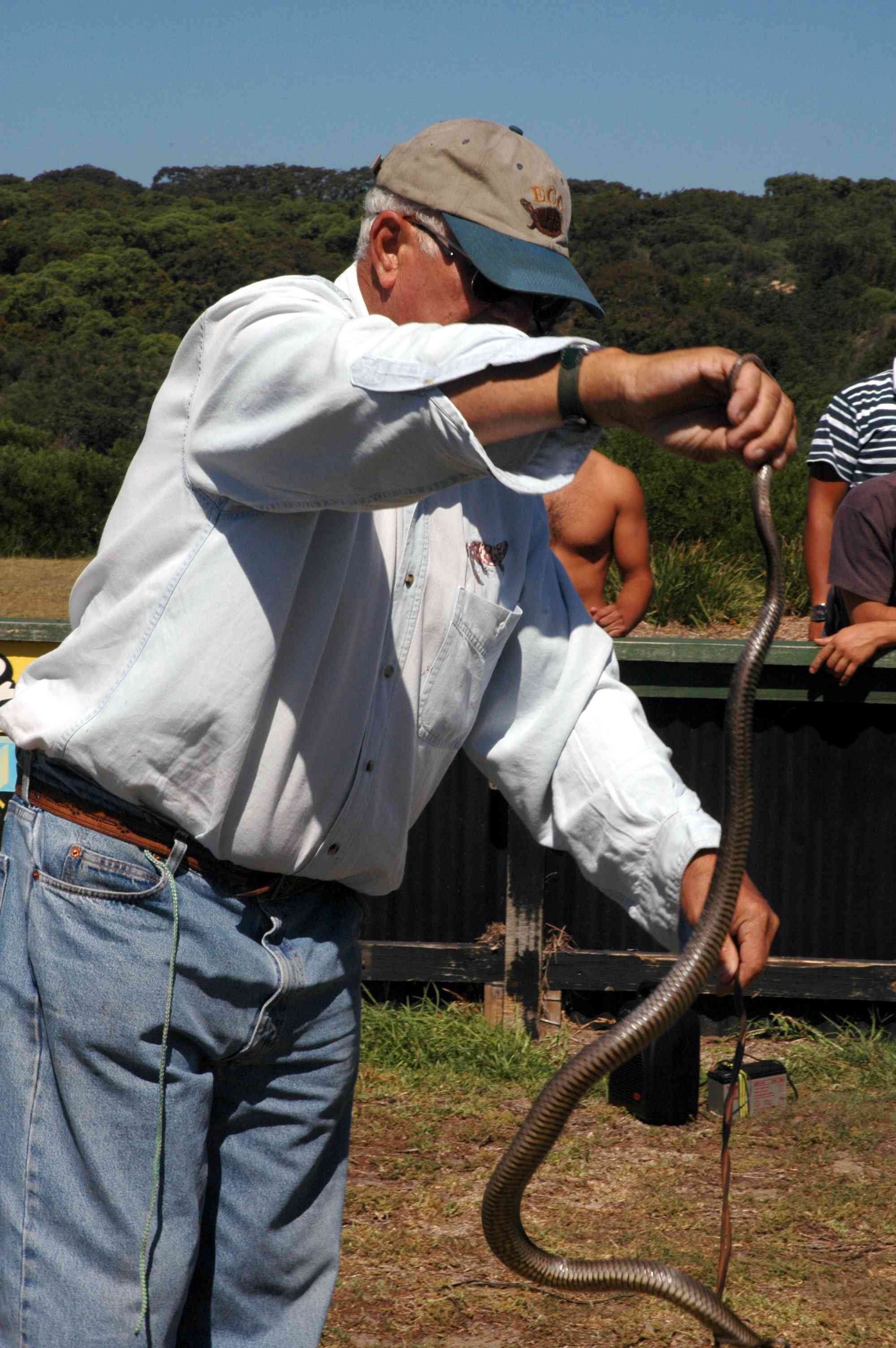
The Snake Man holds a snake aloft by the tail

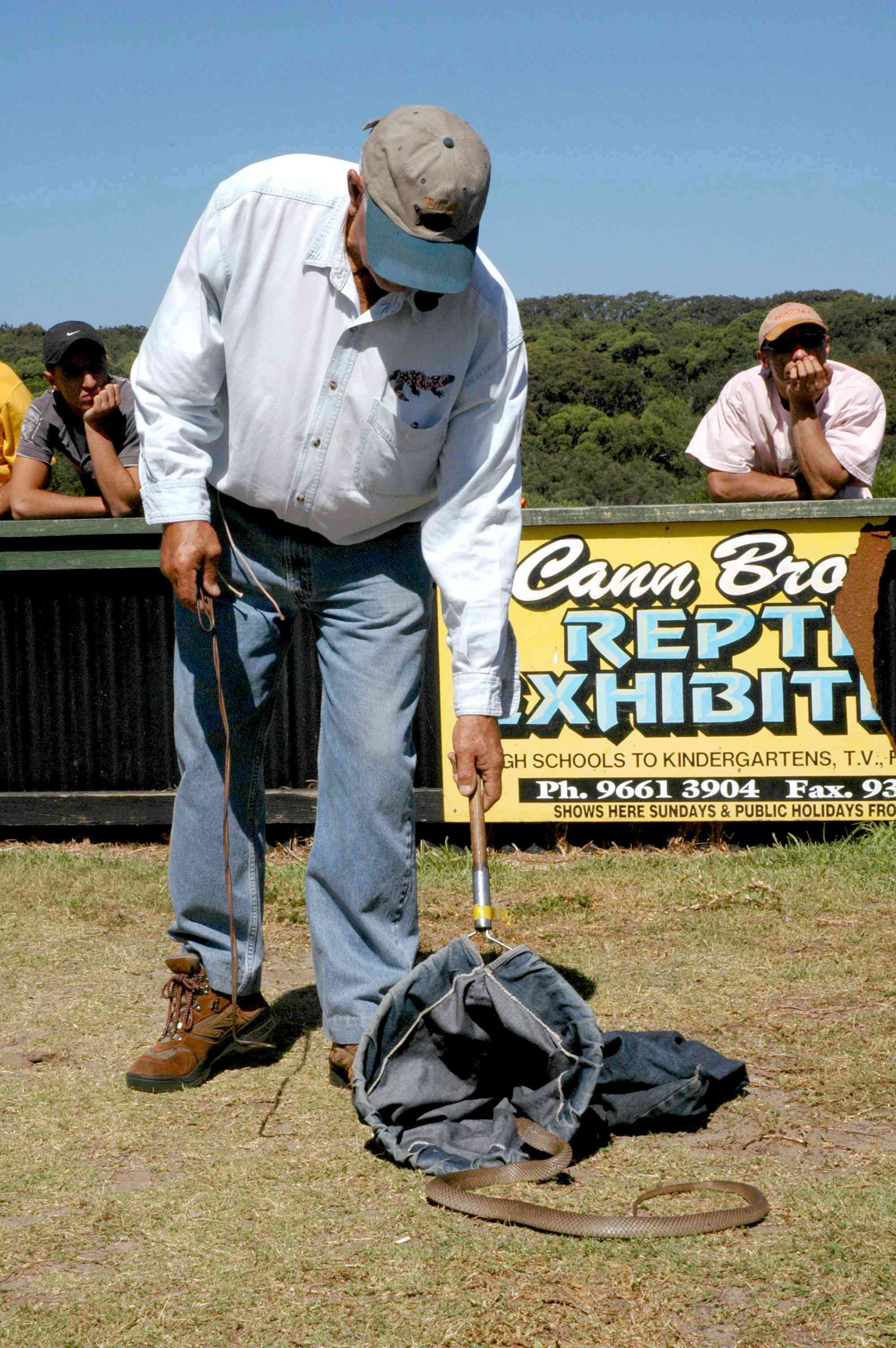
A snake reenters its bag after being shown to the audience
