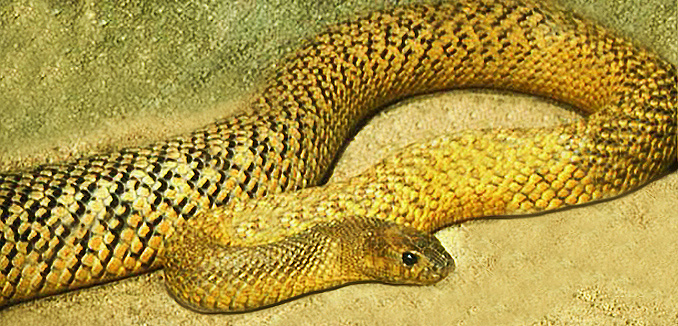
- Inland taipan (Oxyuranus microlepidotus)

Scientific classification
- Kingdom: Animalia
- Phylum: Chordata
- Class: Reptilia
- Order: Squamata
- Suborder: Serpentes
- Family: Elapidae
- Subfamily: Hydrophiinae
- Genus: Oxyuranus; Kinghorn, 1923

Species
- See text

= Taipan =

Genus of snakes native to Australasia

Taipans are snakes of the genus Oxyuranus in the elapid family. They are large, fast-moving, extremely venomous, and endemic to Australia and New Guinea. Three species are recognised, one of which, the coastal taipan, has two subspecies. Taipans are some of the deadliest known snakes.

== Taxonomy ==
The common name, taipan, was coined by anthropologist Donald Thomson after the word used by the Wik-Mungkan Aboriginal people of central Cape York Peninsula, Queensland, Australia. The Wik-Mungkan people used the name in reference to an ancestral creator being in Aboriginal Australian mythology known as the Rainbow Serpent.

The genus name is from Greek ὀξῠ́ς (oxys: sharp, needle-like) and οὐρανός (ouranos: an arch, specifically the vault of the heavens), and refers to the needle-like anterior process on the arch of the palate, which Kinghorn noted separated the genus from all other elapids. The oft-quoted meaning "sharp-tailed" (based on a confusion with οὐρά, oura, "tail", and Latin anus) is both etymologically and morphologically incorrect.

The three known species are the coastal taipan (Oxyuranus scutellatus), the inland taipan (O. microlepidotus), and a recently discovered third species, the Central Ranges taipan (O. temporalis). The coastal taipan has two subspecies: the coastal taipan (O. s. scutellatus), found along the northeastern coast of Queensland, and the Papuan taipan (O. s. canni), found on the southern coast of New Guinea.

A 2016 genetic analysis showed that the speckled brown snake (Pseudonaja guttata) was an early offshoot of a lineage giving rise to the taipans, with the Central Ranges taipan being an offshoot of the common ancestor of the inland and coastal taipans.

=== Species ===
Species	Taxon author	Subspecies	Common name
Oxyuranus microlepidotus^{T}	F. McCoy, 1879	0	Inland taipan
Oxyuranus scutellatus	W. Peters, 1867	2	Coastal taipan
Oxyuranus temporalis	Doughty et al., 2007	0	Central Ranges taipan

== Diet ==
Their diet consists primarily of small mammals, especially rats and bandicoots.

== Venom ==
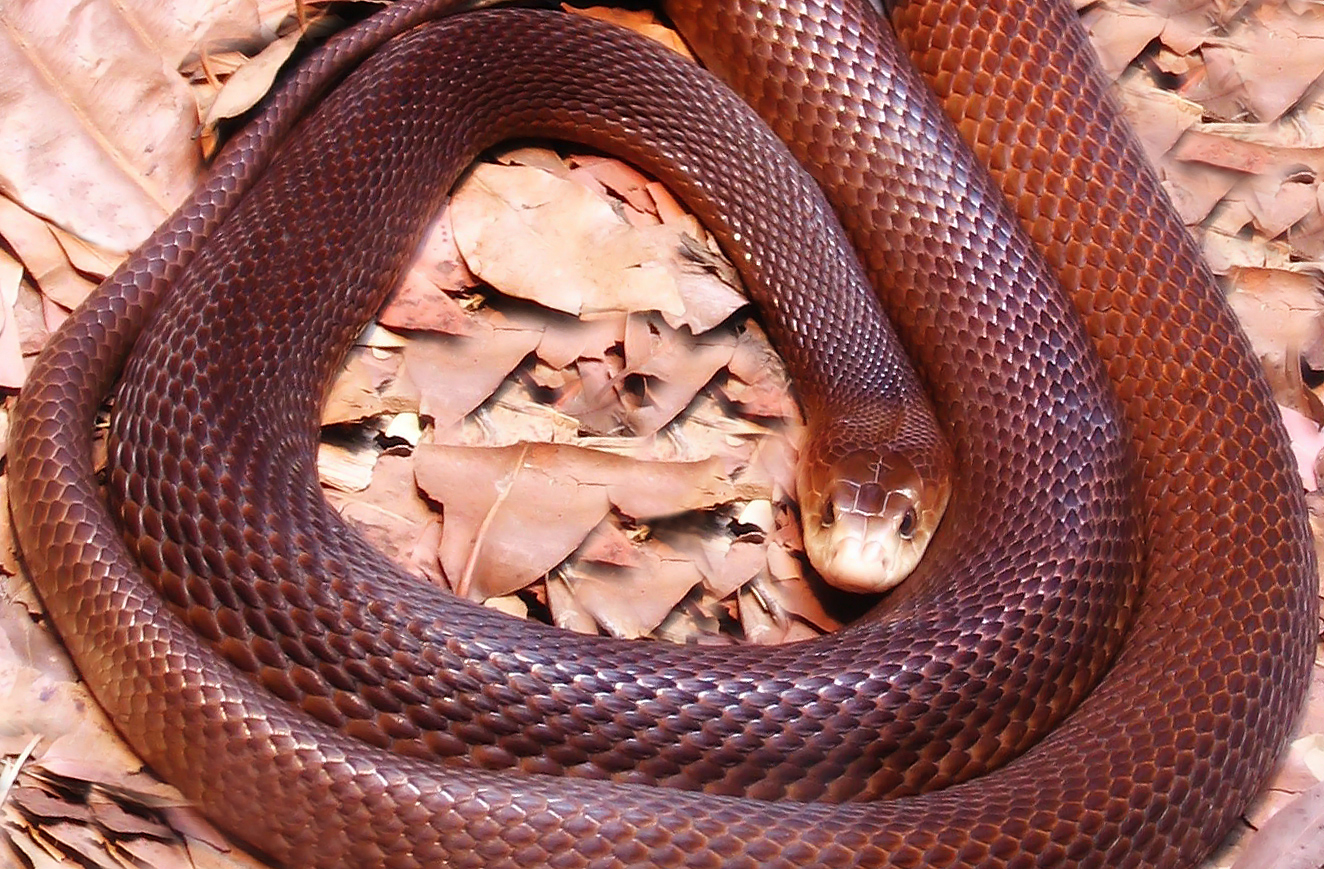
A coastal taipan

Species of this genus possess highly neurotoxic venom with some other toxic constituents that have multiple effects on victims. The venom is known to paralyse the victim's nervous system and clot the blood, which then blocks blood vessels and uses up clotting factors. Members of this genus are considered to be among the most venomous snakes in the world based on their murine LD_{50}, an indicator of the toxicity on mice. The inland taipan is considered to be the most venomous snake in the world and the coastal taipan, which is arguably the largest Australian venomous snake, is the third-most venomous snake in the world. The Central Ranges taipan has been less researched than other species of this genus, so the exact toxicity of its venom is still not clear, but it may be even more venomous than the other taipan species. Apart from venom toxicity, quantities of venom delivered should also be taken into account for the danger posed. The coastal taipan is capable of injecting a large quantity of venom due to its large size.

In 1950, Kevin Budden, an amateur herpetologist, was one of the first people to capture a taipan alive, although he was bitten in the process and died the next day. The snake, which ended up dying a few weeks later, was the first known taipan to have been milked for venom: Melbourne zoologist David Fleay and F. C. Morgan performed the milking, and the venom was used to develop an antivenom, which became available in 1955. The original preserved specimen is currently stored in the facilities of Museums Victoria.

Two antivenoms are available: CSL polyvalent antivenom and CSL taipan antivenom, both from CSL Limited in Australia.

In his book Venom, which explores the development of a taipan antivenom in Australia in the 1940s and 1950s, author Brendan James Murray states that only one person is known to have survived an Oxyuranus bite without antivenom: George Rosendale, a Guugu Yimithirr person bitten at Hope Vale in 1949. Murray writes that Rosendale's condition was so severe that nurses later showed him extracted samples of his own blood that were completely black in colour.

Temperament also varies from species to species. The inland taipan is generally shy, while the coastal taipan can be quite aggressive when cornered and actively defends itself.

== See also ==
- NHIndustries MRH-90 Taipan (Australian helicopter named for this snake)
