= List of fatal snake bites in Australia =

Below is a list of fatal snakebites that occurred in Australia. Omitted incidents include cases where someone died from falling after receiving a bite. Some of the comments include the first aid or treatment that was attempted. For the older fatalities, the term "ligature"" meant wrapping a limb or finger with a string to act like a tourniquet, and the term "scarify" meant cutting the skin so blood flows out of the body, presumably to flush venom. Current practice advises not washing the affected body part so that medical personnel can sample venom residue on the skin to determine which type of snake was involved.

Although Australian snakes can be very venomous, comparatively little is known about the protein compositions of venoms from Australian snakes, compared to those of Asia and America. Wide access to antivenom and adequate medical care has made deaths exceedingly rare with only a few fatalities each year. Australian snakes possess potent venom; 10 of the world's top 10 most venomous snakes live in Australia.

The estimated incidence of snakebites annually in Australia is between 3 and 18 per 100,000 with an average mortality rate of 0.03 per 100,000 per year, or roughly 1 to 2 persons, down from 13 persons per year in the 1920s. Between 1979 and 1998 there were 53 deaths from snakes, according to data obtained from the Australian Bureau of Statistics. Between 1942 and 1950 there were 56 deaths from snakebite recorded in Australia. Of 28 deaths in the 1945-1949 period, 18 occurred in Queensland, 6 in New South Wales, 3 in Western Australia and 1 in Tasmania. Globally, 1.8–2.7 million people are envenomed annually, with more than 125,000 people dying, and for every fatality there are another 3 to 4 people permanently disabled. In 2017, the World Health Organization added snakebite envenoming to their list of Neglected tropical diseases, requesting the cooperation of antivenom agencies worldwide.

A Queensland Government occupational health publication says that "Snakes are not usually aggressive and do not seek confrontation with humans but may retaliate if provoked. The important thing to remember is to never attempt to catch or kill a snake – most snake bites occur when people are trying to do this."

== 19th century ==
Date	Species	Name, age	Location; comments
1 May 1867	Tiger snake	William Drummond, 40, police magistrate	Melbourne, Victoria; A showman named Shires performed an act in which he allowed himself to be bitten by a deadly tiger snake. Drummond, convinced that Shires was a fraud, demanded to be bitten by the snake himself. Shires complied – and Drummond passed away. Shires was acquitted of manslaughter on the grounds that he had been denied the opportunity to treat Drummond using a home-made antivenom.
5 November 1875	Tiger snake	Margaret Falconer, 54	Swan Hill, Victoria; asked by her husband John Falconer to watch a 6ft long tiger snake while he got a stick, Margaret saw the snake retreating into a hole and grabbed it by the tail. She was bitten on the ankle; six puncture wounds were found. She was treated by injecting ammonia and having a galvanic battery applied to the area, but died 50 hours after being bitten.
7 December 1878	Tiger snake	Hugh McFadden, 12yo boy	Alexandra, Victoria; while planting potatoes in a paddock, where his father was also ploughing, he reached into a bag of potatoes that had been sitting on the ground since that morning and was bitten on the hand by a 3ft tiger snake. The snake was killed; first aid was ligature and scarifying, and later a doctor injected him with ammonia. He died 20 hours after being bitten.
October 1884	unknown	Henry Marsh, 6yo boy	Coleraine, New South Wales; the son of William Marsh of Moree was bitten when walking home from school. Taken to Dr. Hayman but died later the same day.
25 February 1887	Red-bellied black snake	Ah Goon, 56	Wangaratta, Victoria; a Chinese market gardener was bitten on the heel. The snake was killed and the head was rubbed on the wound (a Chinese antidote), and the man was removed to Wangaratta Hospital where he died the next day.
25 April 1893	Tiger snake	Charles Mason, 10yo boy	Stawell, Victoria, stepped on a tiger snake on a bush track at about 9am, and the snake doubled up and bit him on the leg. He was taken home, where a ligature was applied by the boy's mother, the wound scarified, and whisky and other stimulants administered. The boy was then taken to Stawell Hospital where he died 8 hours after being bitten by the snake.
May 1893	Tiger snake	Victor Hullar	Victoria, was bitten on the hand during a snake demonstration. First aid: Brandy with some unnamed antidote, and washing the wound. Later a ligature was applied, the victim was injected with strychnine, and he was sent to the hospital where he passed out.
February 1895	Tiger snake	Armit, 8yo boy	Inverary, New South Wales, near Bungonia, bitten on the ankle while crossing a paddock barefooted. First aid: ligature and scarified. Later, strychnine.
January 1896	Unknown	Miss Kelly, 8yo girl	Victoria, bitten on the finger, arm, and throat while asleep on a porch. The snake was killed, the wound scarified and sucked, but the child died on the way to the hospital.
September 1898	Tiger snake	Chapman, 15yo boy	Urana, New South Wales; bitten while bird catching. A friend took them to hospital but arrived four hours after the bite & perished.
January 1899	Tiger snake	Dudley, 13yo female	Bruthen, Victoria; trod on snake while carrying parcel.
January 1899	Mainland tiger snake	Gordon, 9yo boy	Congbool station, Balmoral, Victoria, bitten twice on the thumb while removing some rails to get a rabbit.
March 1899	Tiger snake	Pat O'Rourke, 74yo male	Kilmore, Victoria, bitten on little finger when he went to the barn for some hay. The wound was bound, scarified and sucked. He sought medical treatment and was later sent home where he fell into laziness, but died.

== 20th century ==
=== 1900s ===
Date	Species	Name, age	Location; comments
November 1900		13yo girl	Bendigo, Victoria
September 1901	Tiger snake	Reginald Heeps, 10yo boy	Tallangatta Victoria bitten on the finger while catching rabbits, The wound was scarified, treated by a doctor who administered strychnine and brandy. Died one day later
December 1901	Common death adder	"a little lad"	Wisemans Ferry, New South Wales; bitten on the foot, died before the doctor arrived
October 1902	Tiger snake	15yo boy	Coonong, New South Wales; bitten on the calf while bird-catching, died four hours later
November 1906		small boy	Yea, Victoria
1907		Frances McKnight	Middle Harbour, New South Wales; snake bit her three times on ankle while McKnight was gathering wild-flowers
1908		Walter Harden	Maroubra, New South Wales
1908		Ronald Whitechurch	Seymour, Victoria
1909		Hugh McDay	Deloraine, Tasmania

=== 1910s ===
Date	Species	Name, age	Location; comments
1910	Brown snake	Howard Thomas	Queensland
March 1910		14yo male	Casterton, Victoria; was rabbiting with friends, bitten when put hand in a burrow to get a rabbit
1913	Eastern brown snake	Garnett See	La Perouse, New South Wales, snake show.
15 December 1913	Tiger snake	Harry Deline, 35	Melbourne, snake show. Deline exported snakes to Texas, where his father had a snake farm. On December 12, he attended hospital for a festered finger resulting from a snakebite a month earlier, when he showed some people a snake at Colac and it bit him on the finger. Three days later on December 15, Deline was undertaking a snake show at Luna Park with an assistant known as Sleeping Beauty. She would lie on a stretcher while he covered her with fifty snakes, and at the end, added a tiger snake on top. On this night the tiger snake began to hiss vehemently, and before he could safely secure it, it wrapped itself around his arm and lunged to bite his neck, close to the jugular vein. He collapsed and was taken to hospital by car, but died the next day.
1914	Tiger snake	Alex Rolfe	No further details.
November 1915		21yo male	Laverton, Victoria
1917		Vogel boy	Tintaldra, Victoria
1917	Tiger snake	George Vowells	Sydney, Antidote vendor.

=== 1920s ===
Date	Species	Name, age	Location; comments
27 February 1920	Unknown	Thomas Boxer	Coleraine, Bitten on the hand while trying to catch a rabbit in a burrow on Kurtuk estate. Taken to the homestead then by car to a doctor. Died the following day.
13 March 1920	Tiger snake	Teresa Caton, 26yo female	Sydney, a carnival girl was bitten while 'playing' with some snakes belonging to snake showman Thomas Wanless. The wound was scarified, a ligature applied, and Wanless' antidote administered. The victim refused further treatment until 12 hours after the bite, which was too late. Wanless died the following year in South Africa from a Green mamba bite.
3 December 1920	Tiger snake	Ralph Shegog, 9yo male	Gundowring, Victoria, Bitten at his fathers dairy farm and died one day later.
13 December 1920	Unknown	Colleera Telford, 3yo female	Apollo Bay, Victoria; Bitten while at her parents' dairy farm. Puncture marks found on leg after death.
December 1925	Tiger snake	Charles McPherson	Molesworth, Tasmania; bitten while sitting on a tarpaulin, reading, on a camping trip. The wound was incised and cleansed and a ligature applied. He died in hospital 12 hours after being bitten.
July 1926	Brown snake	Maud Frances Byden, 29yo female	Queensland, the woman was trying to bag a 4 ft long brown snake and it bit her above the knee.
October 1927	Tiger snake	Ernest Pollack, middle-aged male	Fitzroy, Victoria, having collected and bagged several specimens earlier in the day, he was found at home having been bitten.
1928	Tiger snake	Dot Vane	Perth, snake show, wife of Rocky Vane.
May 1928	Tiger snake	C.J. French	Adelaide, bitten on the forearm while giving a demonstration to children at the Adelaide Zoo where he was the curator of the snake park which was opened just two months earlier. Ligature, cut and sucked wound, applied permanganate crystals. He later died at hospital.
February 1929	Tiger snake	Harry Melrose, 42yo male	Perth, William Henry Melrose, a partner of Rocky Vane's, was showing off with a bag of snakes he was bitten on the hand. He was taken to hospital where the wound was scarified and other remedies applied. He died two days after being bitten.

=== 1930s ===
Date	Species	Name, age	Location; comments
1930	Tiger snake	Pegleg Davis	Snake handling.
February 1930	Common death adder	Rachel Pratt, 11yo female	Toowoomba, Queensland, bitten on the foot, brought to hospital but died 3 hours later.
20 March 1930	Undisclosed	Dulcie Joan Wilson, 5yo female	Laceby South
August 1930	Brown snake	Ernest Christian Neimi, 25yo male	near Ingham, Queensland, stepped on the snake and bitten on the ankle, he cut the wound and applied a ligature and antidote. He was rushed to hospital where he died.
November 1930	Tiger snake	Ina Murray	Albury, New South Wales, stepped on the snake and bitten was on the leg. Her husband scarified the wound and she was rushed to hospital where she died soon after.
April 1931	Tiger snake	James/Jimmy Murray, 19yo male	Marrawah, Tasmania, was giving a demonstration. Murray was a snake dealer who caught numerous snakes and sold them to Walter and Eliza Hall Institute of Medical Research for venom extraction and research.
1932	Tiger snake	John Graves	Whittlesea, Victoria, Snake handling
February 1932	Undisclosed	Mrs. Mervyn Cole, 43yo female	Horsham, Victoria; was bitten on the foot while fishing and died several hours later.
March 1932	Undisclosed	Raymond George Barham, 13yo male	Gosford, New South Wales, testimony at a coroner inquest: a ligature was applied and a half-hour later the doctor said black snakes weren't venomous and they removed the ligature.
15 March 1934	Brown snake	Mr Archibald Thompson, 56yo male	Greta, New South Wales; bitten while in the bush, scarified, ligature applied.
December 1934	Tiger snake	Julius Mitchell, 58yo male	Kurri Kurri, New South Wales, known as Milo the Snake Man, he was exhibiting his snakes when one bit him on the hand as he was trying to put it back in its box. He made incisions and applied a liquid, tied a loose ligature, and refused further medical treatment.
24 October 1935	Sea snake	Maso Fukami, 23yo male	Thirty mile offshore Bathurst Island, Northern Territory, a Japanese pearl diver was grasped by an 8 ft sea snake on his wrist. The diver tore the snake off him, was hauled aboard, a ligature applied.
8 October 1936	Death adder	Luigi Valese, 4yo male	Mossman, Queensland; Bitten on his cane farm while in the fields with his father.
18 December 1938	Unknown	Martha Elliot, 53yo female	Kiewa, Victoria; Bitten on the foot after stepping out of a bath. Received antivenine but died one day later.
August 1939	Brown snake	Oley J. Kalloch, 52yo male	Queensland, found five to seven days after his death by a fellow miner and friend, Kalloch had written his will in charcoal on a piece of newspaper, saying he was bitten by a big brown snake. There was a ligature on his leg and his big toe was lanced for scarifying.

=== 1940s ===
Date	Species	Name, age	Location; comments
October 1940	Unidentified	Miss Norma Wells, 12-year-old daughter	Bitten on the foot while walking beside the Goulburn River, died later in hospital.
September 1946	Undisclosed	Norman Boyd, 4yo male	Hampton, New South Wales; He was bitten while playing outside his home and later died after doctors failed to revive him.
January 1948	Tiger snake	Dorothy Vera Townson	Pelion Hut, Overland Track, Tasmania; She had been bitten twice on the lower right leg by a snake, believed to be a tiger snake, about 11.30 am on Wednesday. The snake hung on and bruised her leg after the second strike. The punctures were lacerated and tourniquets applied, but the treatment was ineffective, and Miss Townson died at 4.30 am on Thursday. Numerous hikers took turns carrying her body by litter 24 miles in 18 hours to get her down off the mountain.

=== 1950s ===
Date	Species	Name, age	Location; comments
28 July 1950	Coastal taipan	Kevin Budden, 20yo male	Cairns, Queensland; specimen captured and subsequently milked by David Fleay in Melbourne to produce first antivenom.
1956	Tiger snake	Curley Bell	Haywood swamps, snake collecting.

=== 1970s ===
Date	Species	Name, age	Location; comments
January 1972	Undisclosed	Mark Turner, 6yo male	Lowmead, Queensland, bitten on his shin on his father's property.
January 1973	brown snake	Leonard Sacco, 38yo male	Glenlyon, Queensland, was bitten while out shooting rabbits.
June 1973	brown snake	John Murphy, 55yo male	Charters Towers, Queensland, did not consider the bite serious and didn't seek care until he collapsed five hours later.
1977	Tiger snake	Gordon Kennedy	Brighton, Tasmania, snake exhibition.
1977	P. australis?	Fred Duffy	Darwin, Northern Territory, snake exhibition.

=== 1980s ===
Date	Species	Name, age	Location; comments
1986	Western brown snake	61yo female	Cervantes, Western Australia, bitten on lower leg, walked a distance, no first aid
1989	Western brown snake	33yo female	Carnarvon, Western Australia, unnoticed, no first aid, discovered at autopsy

=== 1990s ===
Date	Species	Name, age	Location; comments
1993	Eastern brown snake	50yo male	Bundaberg, Queensland
24 February 1993	Western brown snake	31yo male	Derby, Western Australia, unwitnessed, snake in bucket, victim found unconscious with head injuries. Assumed to have been bitten, resulting in a fall. Antivenom administered at Derby Hospital but with no improvement. Patient air-ambulanced to Sir Charles Gairdner Hospital where he died.
6 February 1994	Northern death adder	Richard Scott, 2yo male	Fitzroy Crossing, Western Australia, bite not witnessed but confirmed by autopsy.
14 February 1996	Coastal taipan	Peter Ryan, 33 yo male	Kerry, Queensland, bitten twice on left leg on 23 January 1996. Transferred from Beaudesert Hospital to Princess Alexandra Hospital, Brisbane where he died on 14 February 1996. Bite was witnessed, pathology confirmed and multiple doses of antivenom administered. Confirmed as Taipan again on autopsy report
1 December 1997	Western brown snake	Murray Plane, 33yo male	Tarmoola Gold Mine, North of Leonora, Western Australia; Man inebriated and handling snake which he and his friends found in miners' quarters during the night of 1 December. Air-ambulanced to Royal Perth Hospital where he subsequently died on 4 December.
31 Oct 1998	Desert death adder	Michael Ross, 9yo male	Broome, Western Australia, bite not witnessed. Died en route to hospital 180 km away.
5 Nov 1998	Tiger snake	Tony Patterson, 14yo male	High Wycombe, Western Australia, bitten on hand while photographing snake. Initial first aid inadequate, followed by collapse, hospitalization with antivenoms.
1999	Tiger snake	Joey McGlashan, 7yo male	Kennett River, Victoria
29 Nov 1999	Western brown snake	Male, 35yo	Broome, caught snake on 27 Nov. and was bitten while showing snake being placed in a bag. Received antivenom at hospital shortly after.

== 21st century ==
=== 2000s ===
Date	Species	Name, age	Location; comments
2003	Tiger snake	Unnamed, elderly female	Kew, Victoria; bitten while pruning vines.
2 January 2006	Brown snake	Bevan Corbett, 20yo male	Cobar, New South Wales; bitten repeatedly while jogging.
16 April 2007	Whip snake	Ron Siggins, 37yo male	Harcourt, Victoria; bitten on the finger by a snake considered no more deadly than a bee-sting. The victim had been handling snakes for over 30 years and had been bitten by Whip snakes before.
14 January 2007	Eastern brown snake	Undisclosed name, 16yo boy	Whalan, New South Wales; bitten on hand, it is believed his trek to find help in hot conditions may have advanced spread of venom.
10 March 2007	Eastern brown snake	Milena Swilks, 9yo female	Rocky River, New South Wales, bitten on her foot in a vegetable patch and died two hours later.
15 January 2009	Western brown snake	Undisclosed name, 60yo female	Carnarvon, Western Australia

=== 2010s ===
Date	Species	Name, age	Location; comments
26 November 2010	Western brown snake	Michael Thorpe, 43yo male	Gingin, Western Australia, bitten on the toe by a 50 cm snake and died 2½ hours later after being transported to hospital and receiving antivenom.
2 November 2011	Eastern brown snake	Narelle Pails, 42yo	Warwick, Queensland
17 November 2011	Eastern brown snake	Andrew Smith, 35yo	Emerald, Queensland
8 October 2012	Eastern brown snake	Ashley Leishman, 26yo male	Miles, Queensland
1 November 2012	Coastal taipan	Andrew Vaughan, 57yo male	Yeppoon, Queensland
20 December 2012	Brown snake	Undisclosed name, 37yo male	Queensland
10 March 2013	Stephen's banded snake	Bradley "Brad" Hicks, 60yo male	Kalang, New South Wales, man was bitten on the hand. It took three hours to rescue him due to flooding and he didn't reach hospital until 7 hours after the bite.
23 April 2013	Gwardar	Karl Berry, 26yo	Darwin, Northern Territory
2 November 2013	Unknown	Undisclosed name, 59yo female	Glen Oak, New South Wales; most likely bitten by an Eastern brown snake Pseudonaja textilis
8 October 2014	Western brown snake	Undisclosed name, 41yo male	Laverton, Western Australia, bitten multiple times on hand and arm while trying to grab and kill snake. Refused first aid and collapsed 45 minutes later.
6 November 2014	Tiger snake	Shane Tatti, 27yo male	Jarrahmond, Victoria, bitten on the wrist while weeding along a river bank. Tatti died despite getting the ordinary antivenom dose, but later testing revealed he had active venom in his system after his death, leading to debates in the toxicology field about antivenom protocols.
December 2014	Unknown	Dane Kowalski, 27yo male	95 km south of Coober Pedy, South Australia; presumed bitten. His body was found 3 months after his vehicle was found after he went missing.
3 January 2015	Tiger snake	Mrs. Z., 70yo female	Melton, Victoria, bitten on her toe in her sleep in bed. She received two vials of antivenom within 3 hours after the bites, and a third vial later.
17 August 2015	Unconfirmed, possibly a speckled brown snake, tiger snake or dugite	Anna Wortham	South Fremantle, Western Australia, bitten on heel while out walking.
25 October 2015	Brown snake or taipan (unconfirmed)	Undisclosed name, 62yo male	Townsville, Queensland
5 February 2016	Eastern brown snake	Undisclosed name, 6yo female	Walgett, New South Wales
10 April 2016	Coastal taipan	Wayne Cameron, 54yo male	Rockhampton, Queensland
26 December 2016	Coastal taipan	David Pitt, 77yo male	Yorkeys Knob, north of Cairns, Queensland
10 January 2018	Eastern brown snake	Brent Crough, 24yo male	Tamworth, New South Wales
5 February 2018	Unknown	Sinita Martin, 27yo female	Meekatharra, Western Australia; The 27-year-old victim's unborn baby also died as a result of the snake bite.
19 April 2018	Eastern brown snake	Aaron Bryant, 46yo male	Deeragun, Queensland; A man carried the snake over to a neighbor to see if he could identify it, saying it had bitten him. He collapsed shortly afterwards.
4 October 2018	Unknown sea snake species	Harry Evans, 23yo male	Offshore, near Groote Eylandt, Northern Territory; Bitten while pulling in a net. First sea snake fatality in Australia since 1935.
9 October 2018	Unknown	Mary Nicholls, 83yo female	Koorda, Western Australia, bitten on ankle while pushing a wheelbarrow. Victim told her son she felt the snake brush past but didn't think she was bitten, though blood was found on closer examination. Following symptoms of vomiting, she was placed in an induced coma but died in hospital in Perth.
29 December 2018	Tiger snake	Callum Edwards, 20yo male	Lardner, 5 km south-west of Warragul, Victoria; Bitten whilst attending the Beyond the Valley music festival on 29 December 2018 and was airlifted to hospital, where he died on 1 January 2019. His death was initially suspected to have occurred from a drug overdose, however medical staff later found traces of tiger snake venom in his system.
17 March 2019	Unknown	Nathan Scattini, 41yo male	Champion Lakes, Western Australia; Nathan Scattini telephoned emergency services, saying he had been bitten by a snake on 17 March while bushwalking in the Kelmscott area. Emergency services were unable to locate Scattini or make further contact and a search operation commenced. Police located Scattini's body in bushland on 19 March.
23 October 2019	Western brown snake	Dale Steele, 68yo male	Northern Territory; A tourist from South Australia died while camping in the Garig Gunak Barlu National Park. He sought help at the ranger's station, but lost consciousness and died.

=== 2020s ===
Date	Species	Name, age	Location; comments
28 January 2020	Tiger snake	Winston Fish, 78yo male	Oatlands, Tasmania; bitten at least five times by a large snake while travelling on his farm, died at Royal Hobart Hospital two days later.
30 January 2020	Eastern brown snake	Roger Taylor, 76yo male	Vale View, Queensland; Passed out in Princess Alexandra Hospital several days after being bitten approximately 4 times by a Brown Snake while moving nets at his Vale View property. Initially unaware of severity, the victim drove approximately 30 minutes to Toowoomba to attend a gathering where he collapsed and hit his head.
20 September 2020	Eastern brown snake	Timote Ongosia, 40yo male	Dimbulah, Queensland; Tongan seasonal fruit picker, died in Cairns Hospital two days later.
20 May 2021	Unknown	Vange Missios, 49yo male	Taradale, Victoria; Had been working on a landscaping job on May 12 before visiting a local transfer station where he collapsed, suffering cardiac arrest. Paramedics worked on him for an hour and a half and his heart stopped three times as they tried to save him. It was later discovered that he had unknowingly been bitten by a snake at some point that day. He was placed in an induced coma and on life support for days following, but died on May 20.
21 November 2021	Unknown	Tristian Frahm, 11yo male	Murgon, Queensland; bitten while visiting a property with his father, who was later charged with manslaughter after failing to seek medical attention.
2 November 2022	Eastern brown snake	Michelle Geary, 55yo female	Gayndah, Queensland
28 January 2023	Suspected eastern brown snake	Unknown, 60s male	Kensington Grove, Queensland
24 October 2023	Suspected eastern brown snake	Benjamin Haffner, 25yo male	Nullawil, Victoria; bitten while working at a grain receival site, later died in hospital.
20 March 2024	Eastern brown snake	Jerromy Brookes, 47yo male	Deeragun, Queensland; suffered multiple snake bites on his left arm at a childcare centre, later died in hospital.
27 November 2024	Eastern brown snake	Beau Horan, 16yo male	Gladstone, Queensland; Bitten on the foot at home, later died in hospital.
1 September 2025	Eastern brown snake	40yo female	Katherine, Northern Territory; Bitten on the ankle in a suburb pathway, later signed-in at work and collapsed.

== See also ==
- Snakes of Australia
- Epidemiology of snakebites
- List of dangerous snakes
- Snakebite
- Venomous snakes
- List of fatal snake bites in the United States
