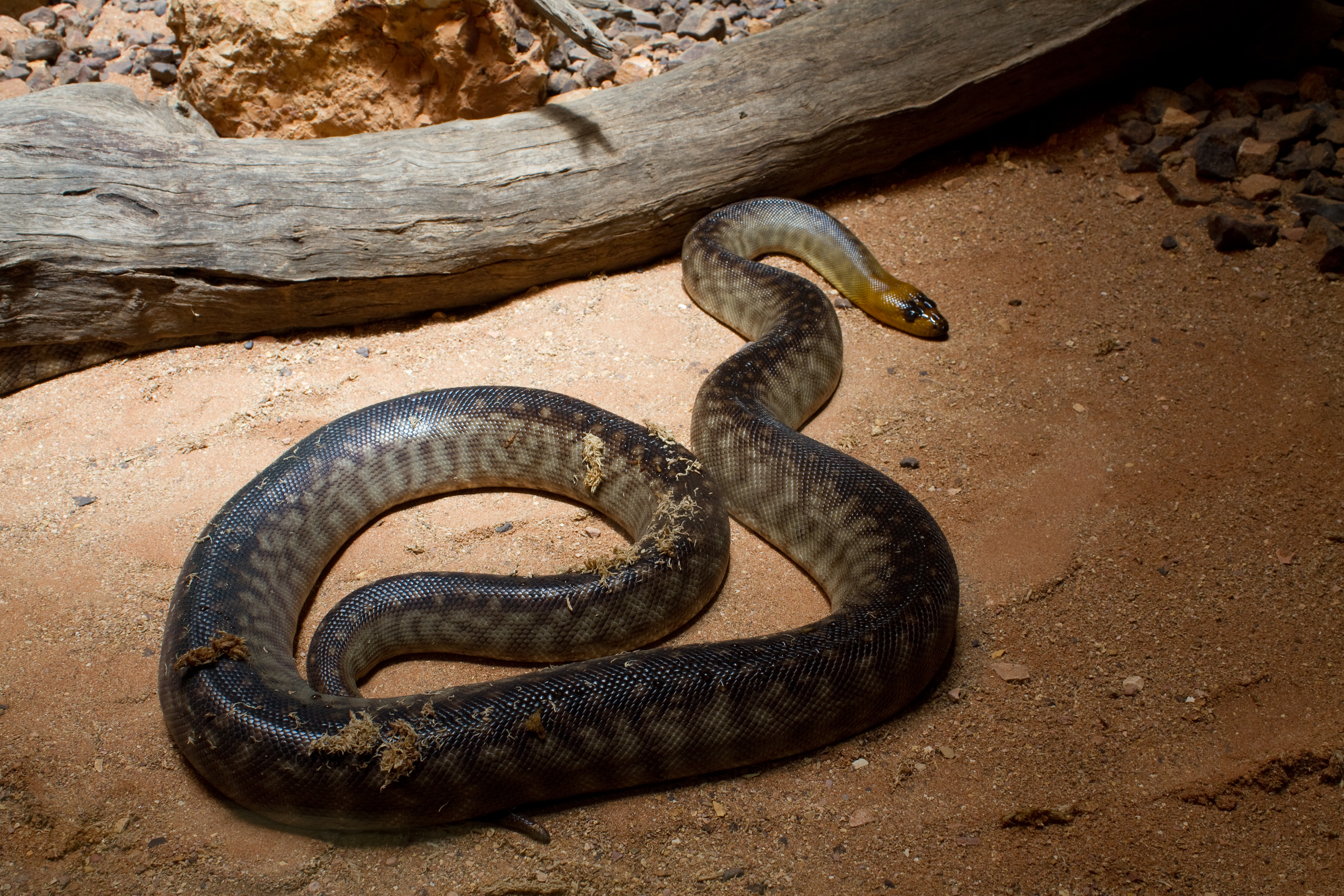

Conservation status
- Least Concern (IUCN 3.1)

Scientific classification
- Kingdom: Animalia
- Phylum: Chordata
- Class: Reptilia
- Order: Squamata
- Suborder: Serpentes
- Family: Pythonidae
- Genus: Aspidites
- Species: A. ramsayi

Binomial name
- Aspidites ramsayi (Macleay, 1882)
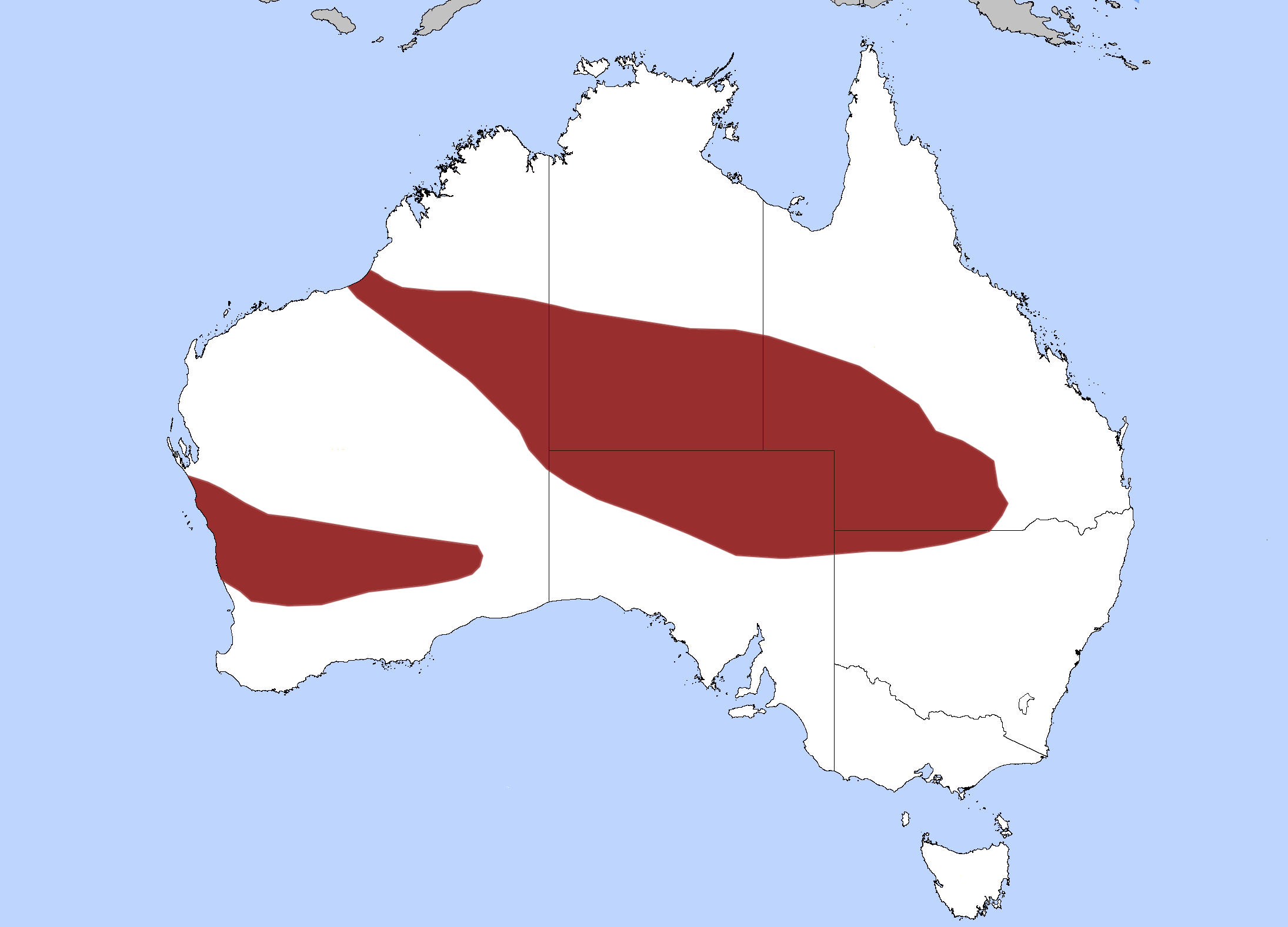
- Distribution of the woma

Synonyms
- Aspidiotes ramsayi Macleay, 1882; Aspidites ramsayi — Boulenger, 1893; Aspidites collaris Longman, 1913; Aspidites melanocephalus ramsayi — Loveridge, 1934; Aspidites melanocephalus ramsayi — Stull, 1935; Aspidites ramsayi — H.G. Cogger, Cameron & H.M. Cogger, 1983; Aspidites collaris — Wells & Wellington, 1984; Aspidites ramsayi — Underwood & Stimson, 1993

= Woma python =

Species of snake

The woma python (Aspidites ramsayi), also known commonly as Ramsay's python, the sand python, and simply the woma, is a species of snake in the family Pythonidae, endemic to Australia. Once common throughout Western Australia, it has become critically endangered in some regions.

== Taxonomy ==
William John Macleay originally described the species in 1882 as Aspidiotes ramsayi. The specific name, ramsayi, is in honor of Australian zoologist Edward Pierson Ramsay.

This is one of two species of Aspidites, the pitless pythons, an Australian genus of the family Pythonidae. The generic name, Aspidites, translates to "shield bearer" in reference to the symmetrically shaped head scales.

== Description ==
Adults of A. ramsayi typically are around 1.5 m (4.5 feet) in total length (including tail). The head is narrow, and the eyes are small. The body is broad and flattish in profile, while the tail tapers to a thin point.

The dorsal scales are small and smooth, with 50–65 rows at midbody. The ventral scales are 280–315 in number, with an undivided anal plate, and 40–45 mostly single subcaudal scales. Some of the posterior subcaudals may be irregularly divided.

The dorsal color may be pale brown to nearly black. The pattern consists of a ground color that varies from medium brown and olive to lighter shades of orange, pink, and red, overlaid with darker striped or brindled markings. The belly is cream or light yellow with brown and pink blotches. The scales around the eyes are usually a darker color than the rest of the head.

Aspidites ramsayi may reach a total length of 2.3 m (7.5 ft), with a snout-vent length (SVL) of 2.0 m (6.6 ft).

Snakes of the genus Aspidites lack the heat-sensing pits of all other pythons. A. ramsayi is similar in appearance to A. melanocephalus, but without an obvious neck. The coloration or desire to locate this species may lead to confusion with the venomous species Pseudonaja nuchalis, commonly known as the gwardar.

== Distribution and habitat ==
Aspidites ramsayi lives in the west and center of Australia, from Western Australia through southern Northern Territory and northern South Australia to southern Queensland and northwestern New South Wales. Its range may be discontinuous. The type locality is "near Forte Bourke" New South Wales, Australia.

The range in Southwest Australia extends from Shark Bay, along the coast and inland regions, and was previously common on sandplains. The species was recorded in regions to the south and east, with once extensive wheatbelt and goldfield populations.

== Conservation status ==
A. ramsayi is classified as Least Concern on the IUCN Red List of Threatened Species.

The Adelaide Zoo in South Australia is co-ordinating a captive breeding program for the species, and the offspring raised have been released into the Arid Recovery Reserve in the states north with no success due to mulga snake, Pseudechis australis, predation.

Many populations in the southwest of the country, since the 1960s, became critically endangered by altered land use. The sharp decline in numbers, without an authenticated record since 1989, was most notable in the Wheatbelt areas.

== Behavior ==
Aspidites ramsayi is largely nocturnal. By day this snake shelters in hollow logs or under leaf debris. When travelling across hot sands or other surfaces it lifts its body off the ground and reaches far forward before pushing off the ground again, having only a few inches of its body touching the ground at a time.

== Feeding ==
Aspidites ramsayi preys upon a variety of terrestrial vertebrates such as small mammals, ground birds, and lizards. It catches much of its prey in burrows where there is not enough room to maneuver coils around the prey; instead, the woma pushes a loop of its body against the animal to pin it against the side of the burrow. Many adult womas are covered in scars from retaliating prey as this technique does not kill prey as quickly as normal constriction.

Although this species will take warm-blooded prey when offered, A. ramsayi preys mainly on reptiles. Perhaps due to this, species within the genus Aspidites lack the characteristic heat sensing pits of pythons, although they possess an equivalent sensory structure in the rostral scale.

== Reproduction ==
Aspidites ramsayi is oviparous, with five to 20 eggs per clutch. Females remain coiled around their eggs until they hatch, with the incubation period lasting 2–3 months. An adult female about 4–5 years old and 5 ft (about 1.5 m) in total length usually lays about 11 eggs.

== Captivity ==
Considered to be more active than many pythons, as well as being a very docile and "easy to handle" snake, the woma is highly sought after in the reptile and exotic pet trade. It is one of the hardiest python species in captivity, often enthusiastically accepting prey and other items. One made headlines in May 2015 for requiring surgery to remove the feeding tongs it had swallowed as well as its meal. This snake will breed in captivity.

== Culture ==
Mutitjulu Waterhole at Uluru marks the site of the battle between two Central Australian ancestral beings Kuniya (woma python woman) and Liru (king brown snake man). Here, Kuniya avenged the death of her nephew, who was fatally speared by Liru, by striking him with her digging stick.
