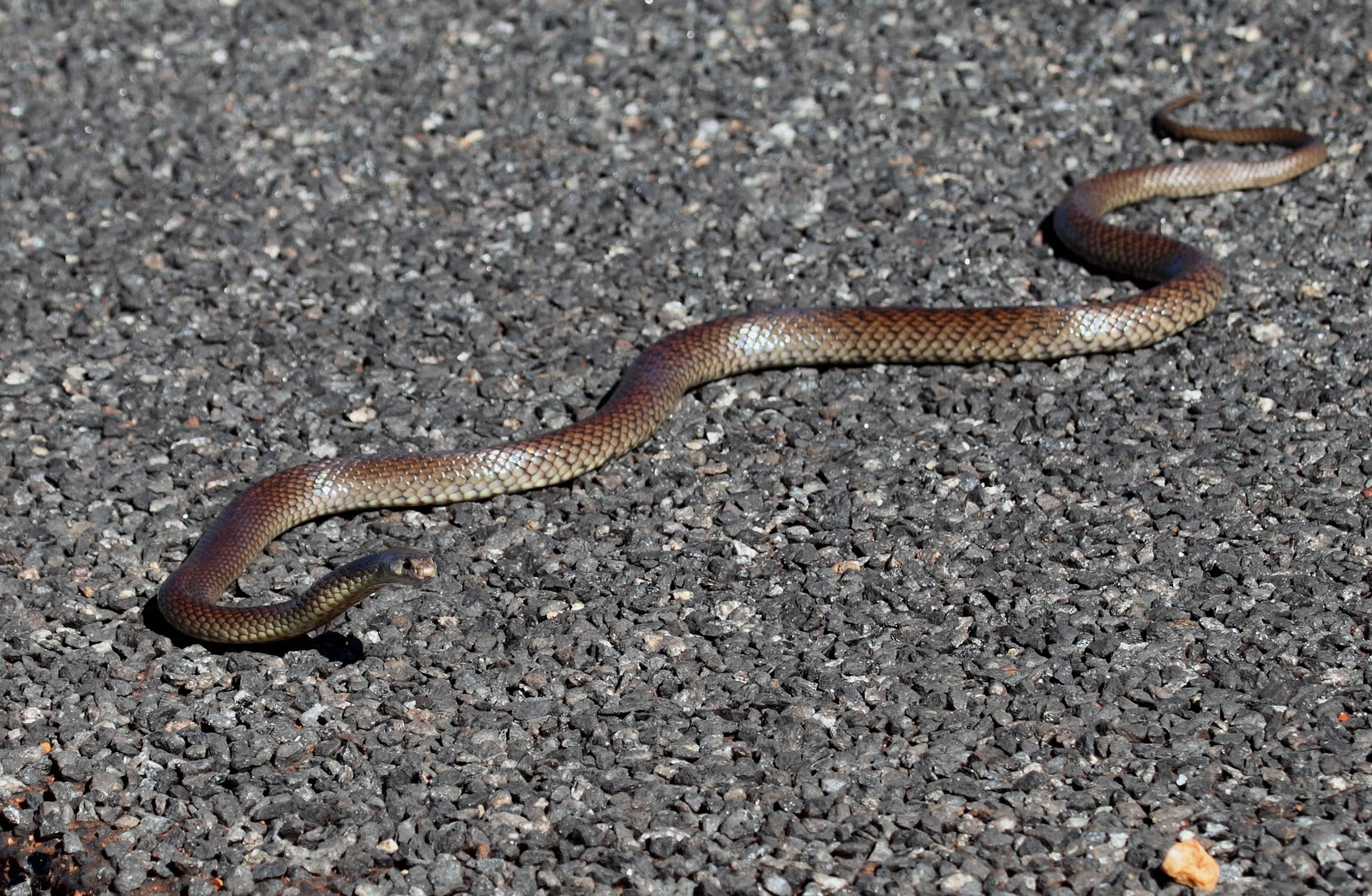

Scientific classification
- Kingdom: Animalia
- Phylum: Chordata
- Class: Reptilia
- Order: Squamata
- Suborder: Serpentes
- Family: Elapidae
- Genus: Pseudonaja
- Species: P. aspidorhyncha

Binomial name
- Pseudonaja aspidorhyncha (F. McCoy, 1879)

Synonyms
- Diemenia aspidorhyncha F. McCoy, 1879; Diemenia carinata Longman, 1915; Pseudonaja gowi — Wells, 2002

= Strap-snouted brown snake =

Highly venomous snake native to Australia

The strap-snouted brown snake (Pseudonaja aspidorhyncha) is a species of venomous snake in the family Elapidae. The species is native to South Australia, New South Wales, Queensland, and Victoria. P. aspidorhyncha is part of a species complex that also includes P. mengdeni and P. nuchalis; all were formerly included in the latter species.

== Taxonomy ==
Frederick McCoy described the species in 1879 as the shield-fronted brown snake, distinguishing it from the eastern brown snake (P. textilis) by its narrow head, truncated snout and large rostral plate over the back of its head, He noted its similarity to the western brown snake (P. nuchalis). Heber Longman described Diemenia carinata in 1915 from a specimen from Cane Grass Station near Charleville in southwestern Queensland. it was known locally as "tiger snake". Francis J. Mitchell of the South Australian Museum described Demansia acutirostris from an island in Lake Eyre, noting its depressed snout distinguishing it from other brown snakes.

Australian herpetologist Richard W. Wells divided P. nuchalis into eight species, recognising P. aspidorhyncha, P. carinata and P acutirostris as distinct. These additional species have not been recognized by other authors, and Wells has been strongly criticized for lack of rigour in his research.

For many years, the taxon was regarded as a southern population of a broadly defined P. nuchalis despite the diverse nature of populations included within. The scientific name was resurrected in 2009 as genetic and morphological data confirmed it as a distinct lineage, and it was the oldest binomial name that had been applied to the taxon - hence it had priority.

== Description ==
Generally up to 1.5 metres long, the strap-snouted brown snake is a long thin snake, with no demarcation between its head and neck. The snout has a distinctive chisel shape.

It has light- to medium brown upperparts.

=== Scalation ===
The number and arrangement of scales on a snake's body are a key element of identification to species level. The eastern brown snake has 17 rows of dorsal scales at midbody, 207 to 226 ventral scales, 47 to 63 divided subcaudal scales, and a divided anal scale. Its mouth is lined with six (rarely five) supralabial scales above and seven (rarely eight) sublabial scales below. Its nasal scale is undivided. Its eyes have two postocular scales.

== Distribution and habitat ==
The strap-snouted brown snake is found across central-southern Australia from Hermidale in New South Wales to Penong in South Australia.
