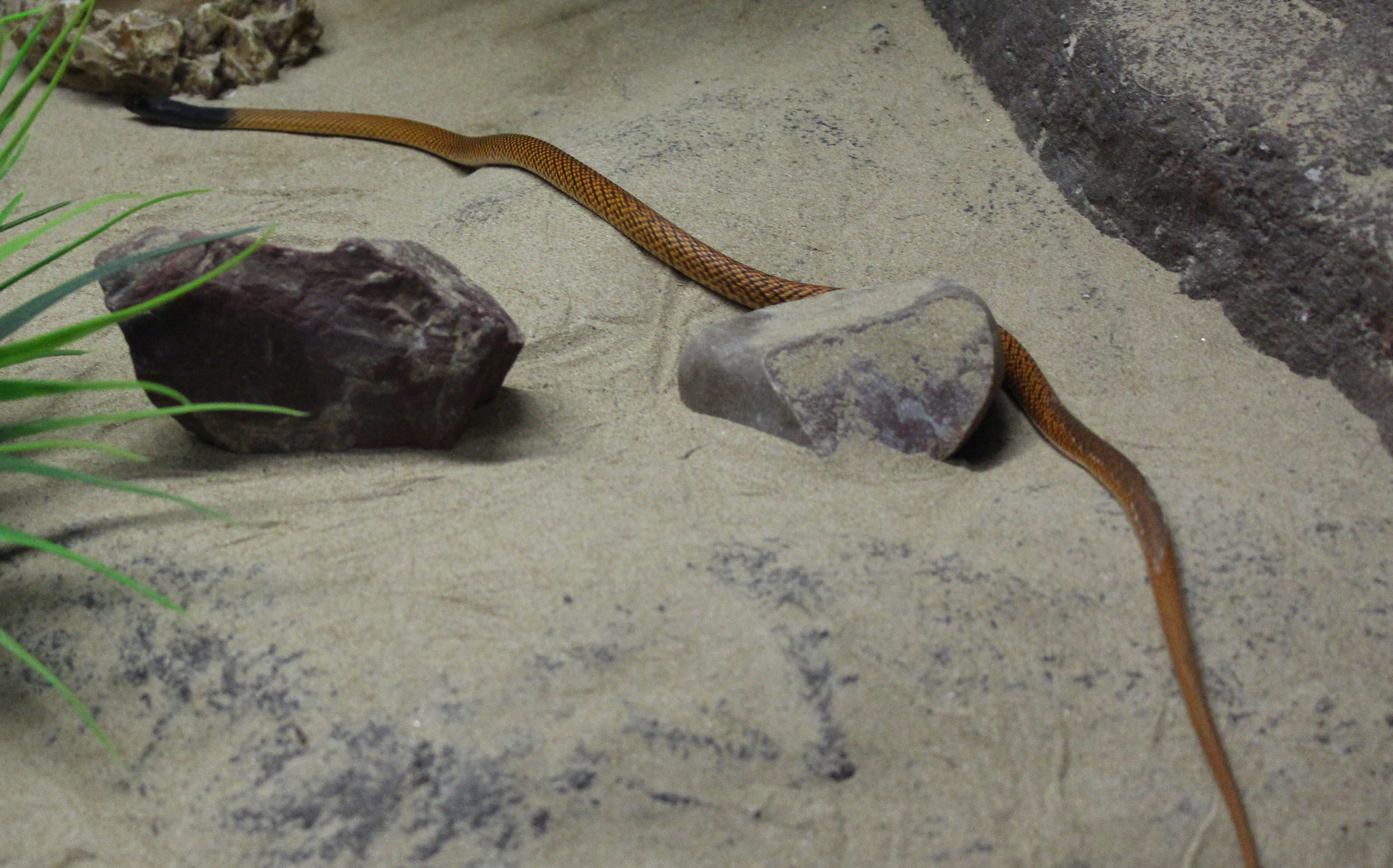

Conservation status
- Least Concern (IUCN 3.1)

Scientific classification
- Kingdom: Animalia
- Phylum: Chordata
- Class: Reptilia
- Order: Squamata
- Suborder: Serpentes
- Family: Elapidae
- Genus: Pseudonaja
- Species: P. mengdeni

Binomial name
- Pseudonaja mengdeni (Wells & Wellington, 1985)

= Pseudonaja mengdeni =

Western brown snake

Highly venomous snake native to Western Australia

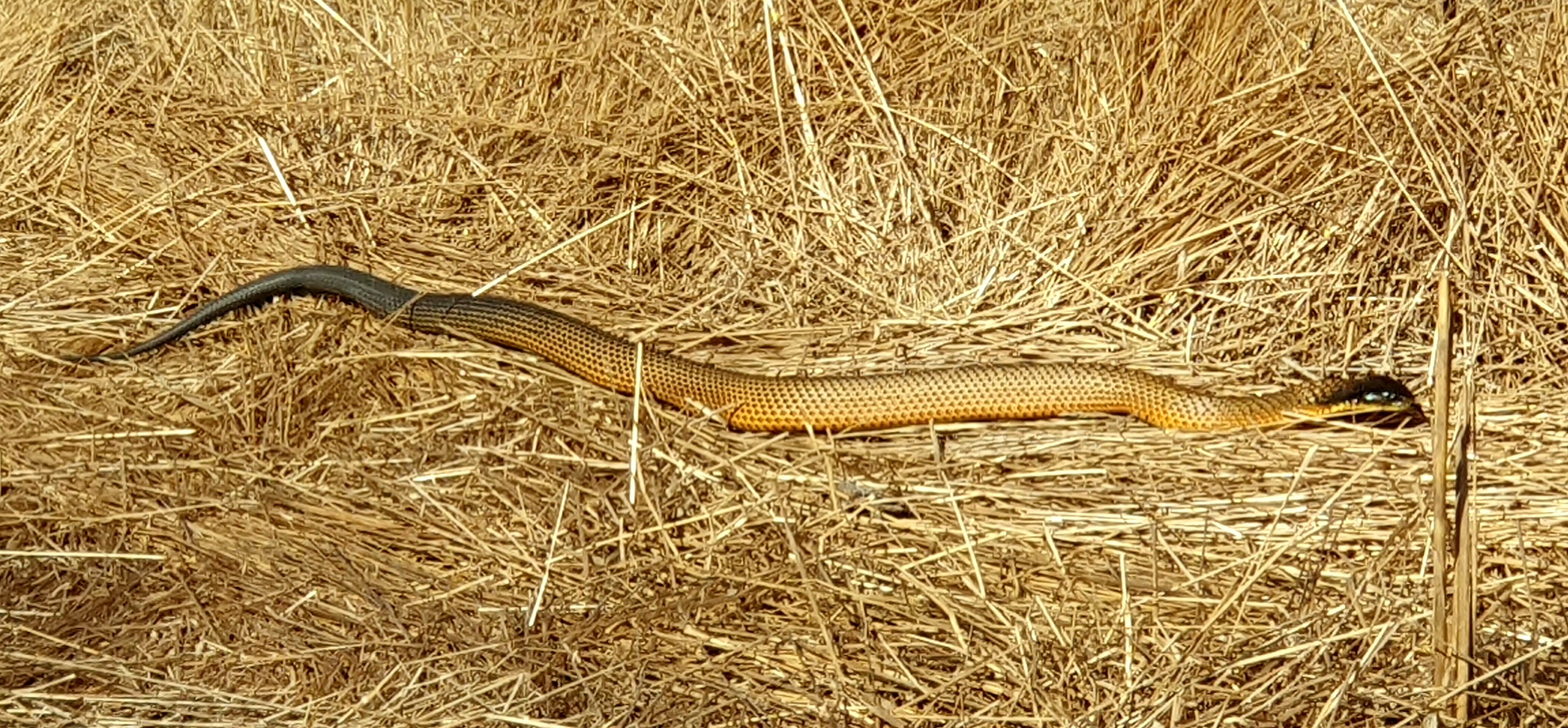
Western brown snake along fenceline in oat stubble, Mt Barker, Western Australia

The western brown snake (Pseudonaja mengdeni) is commonly known as Mengden's brown snake, and alternatively, gwardar.

Pseudonaja mengdeni is endemic to Australia. It is highly variable in colour and patterns and is a highly dangerous elapid whose bite can cause severe symptoms resulting in death. It is one of the three species originally classified as Pseudonaja nuchalis along with P. aspidorhyncha, and P. nuchalis.

== Taxonomy ==
Previously the western brown snake was considered a morph form of Pseudonaja nuchalis, but recent genetic studies have proven it to be genetically unique.

It is estimated that Pseudonaja nuchalis could include in excess of ten different species. Although currently there have been eight species chromosomeally identified species these include: P. aspidorhyncha, P. mengdeni, P. imperator, P. acutirostris, P. gowi, P. carinata, P. kellyi and P. nuchalis.

== Description ==
Pseudonaja mengdeni grows up to a total length of 2 metres (6 ft 7 in) with an average length 1.2 metres (3 ft 11 in). It has slender body and narrow head. Mengden's brown snake is highly variable in colour and patterns, ranging from light brown to almost black, however it has two distinct forms: "orange with black head" and "pale head, grey nape". The underside along the belly is often cream, yellow, orange, or grey in colouration, frequently consisting of dark orange or grey blotches.

Scales on the head often form a black V or W pattern. Western brown snakes can be confused with the eastern brown snake, which has a pink mouth lining; the northern brown snake has a purplish/blue-black mouth lining. P. mengdeni has a distinctive large strap-like scale around the front of the snout. To accurately identify this species the scales around the mid-body and along the lips need to be counted. 180-230 ventral scales, 45-70 subcaudals with a divided anal scale and 17 or 19 rows of smooth mid-body scales. However this must only be done by an experienced herpetologist, as a scratch from the fangs can still be fatal from P. mengdeni.

Confusion between the species is largely due to the possible hybridisation between the Pseudonaja species.

The western brown snake is often confused with other Pseudonaja spp. (brown snakes) and also Aspidites melanocephalus (black headed python).

== Distribution and habitat ==
It is found from the coast of Western Australia through central Australia to the north-west of New South Wales and western Queensland. The species distribution is poorly defined within its northern limits; however, it is absent from wetter areas of eastern Australia and south-western Western Australia.

Pseudonaja mengdeni is found throughout all dry to arid areas including, woodlands, boree woodlands, sandhill woodlands, mallee woodlands, spinifex deserts, spinifex-covered dunefields, sandplains, stony plains, croplands, grasslands and temperate sclerophyll forests. The western brown snake is often found within fallen timber, dead trees, shrubs, native grasses and ground cavities.

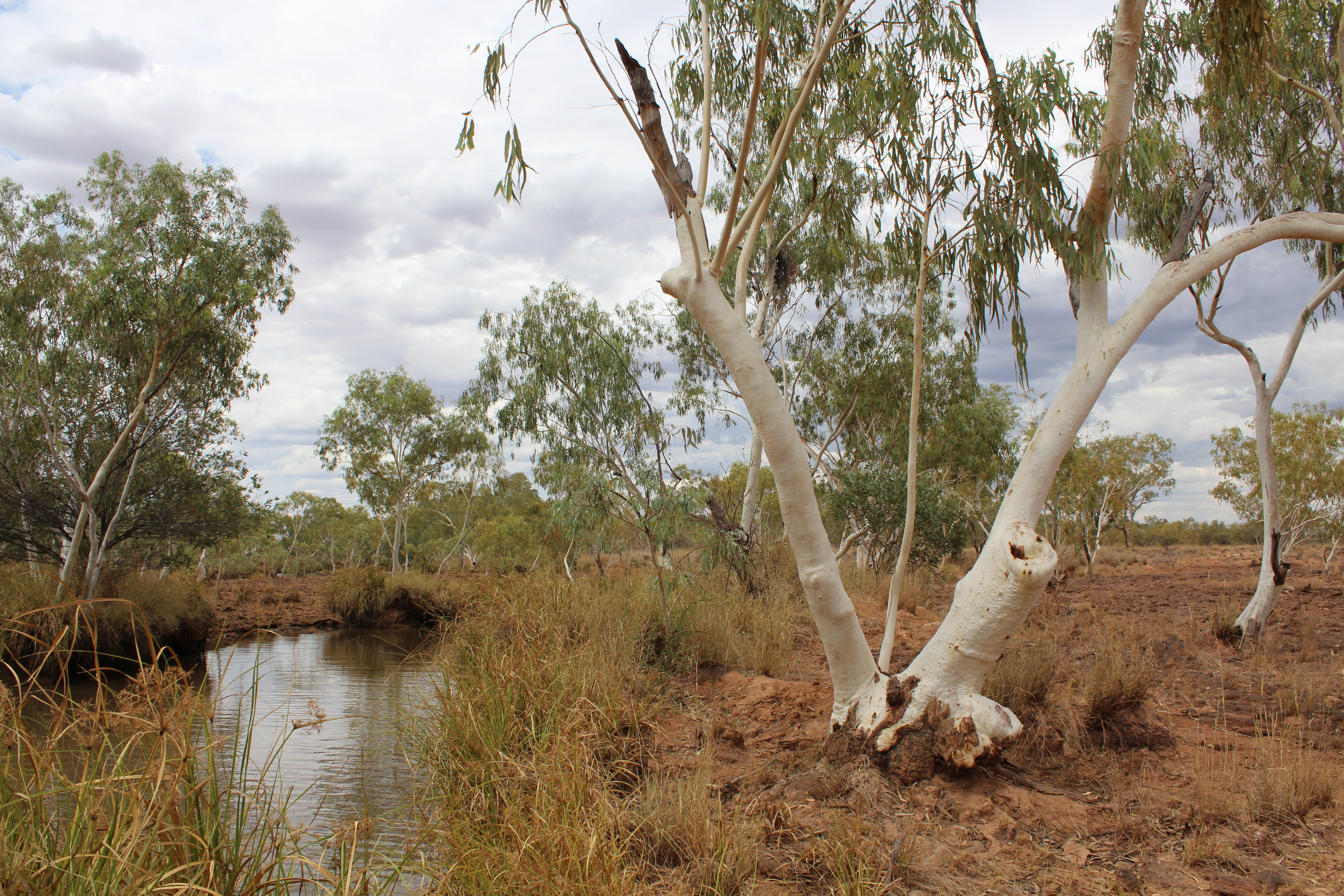

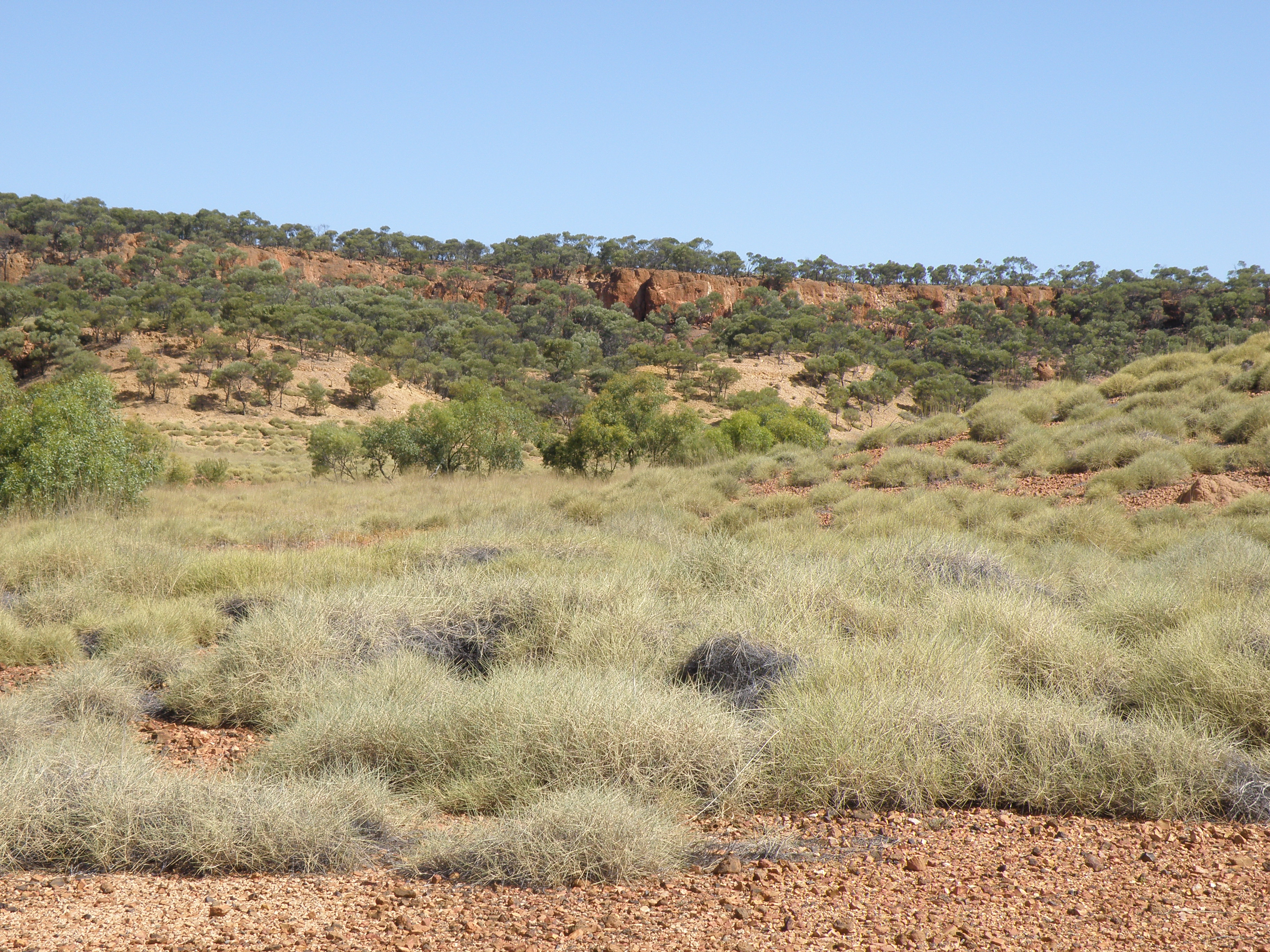

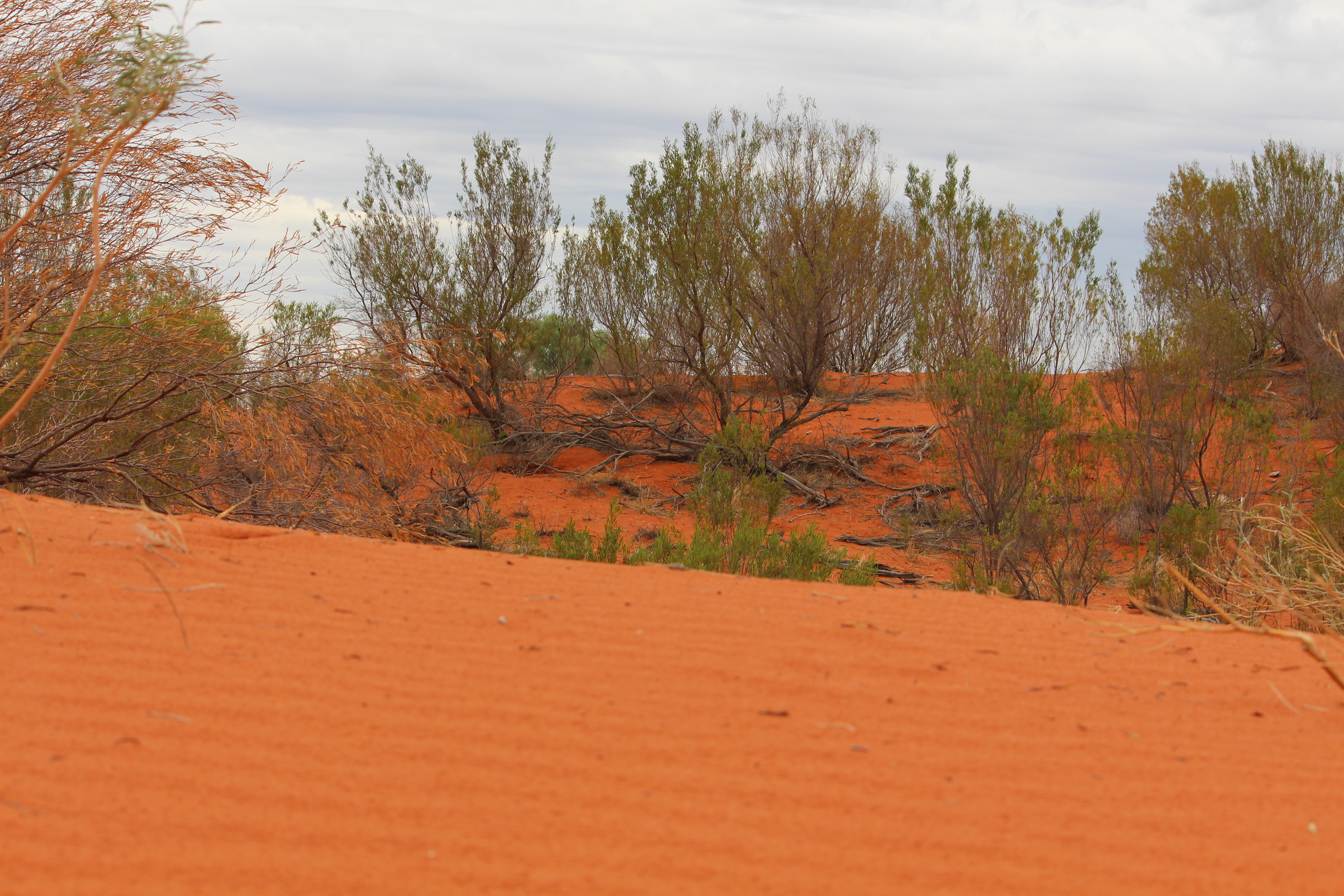

== Diet ==
Pseudonaja mengdeni preys upon small reptiles, mammals, other snakes, ground nesting birds and bird eggs.

== Reproduction ==
Pseudonaja mengdeni is oviparous and can lay up to in excess of 12 eggs per clutch.

== Venom ==
Pseudonaja mengdeni has highly dangerous venom neurotoxic and haemotoxic and can cause severe symptoms resulting in death. Mengden's brown snake is considered dangerously venomous.

Antivenom used in case of envenoming is the brown snake antivenom. If bitten first aid must be applied and medical attention sought.

== Behaviour ==
Pseudonaja mengdeni will rear their fore-body into an S-shape when threatened lifting their head off the ground and open their mouth. Is also a terrestrial species that is diurnal however it can be active on warm nights.
