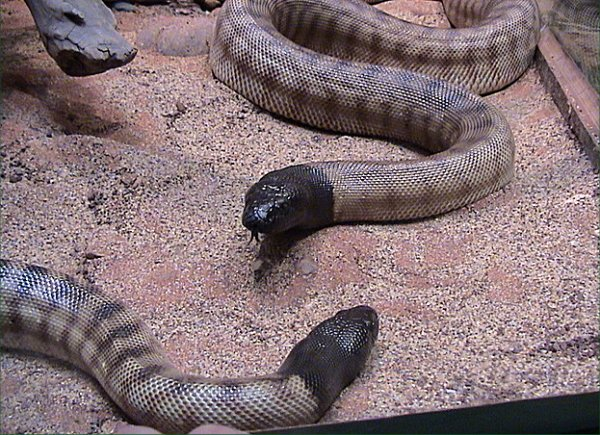
- Black-headed python, Aspidites melanocephalus

Scientific classification
- Domain: Eukaryota
- Kingdom: Animalia
- Phylum: Chordata
- Class: Reptilia
- Order: Squamata
- Suborder: Serpentes
- Family: Pythonidae
- Subfamily: Pythoninae
- Genus: Aspidites; W. Peters, 1877

Synonyms
- Aspidiotes Krefft, 1864; Aspidiotus W. Peters, 1876; Aspidites W. Peters, 1877

= Aspidites =

Genus of snakes

Aspidites is a genus of pythons endemic to Australia. The name can be translated as "shield bearer" and pertains to the symmetrically shaped head scales. Currently, two species are recognized.

== Description ==
These snakes lack the heat-sensitive pits between the labial scales that most other python species have.

The head is slightly wider than the neck, and the eyes are small, with a vertically elliptic pupils.

== Distribution and habitat ==
They are found in Australia except in the south of the country.

== Behavior ==
Both species are nocturnal, and terrestrial.

== Reproduction ==
Oviparous, the females stay with their eggs until they hatch.

== Species ==
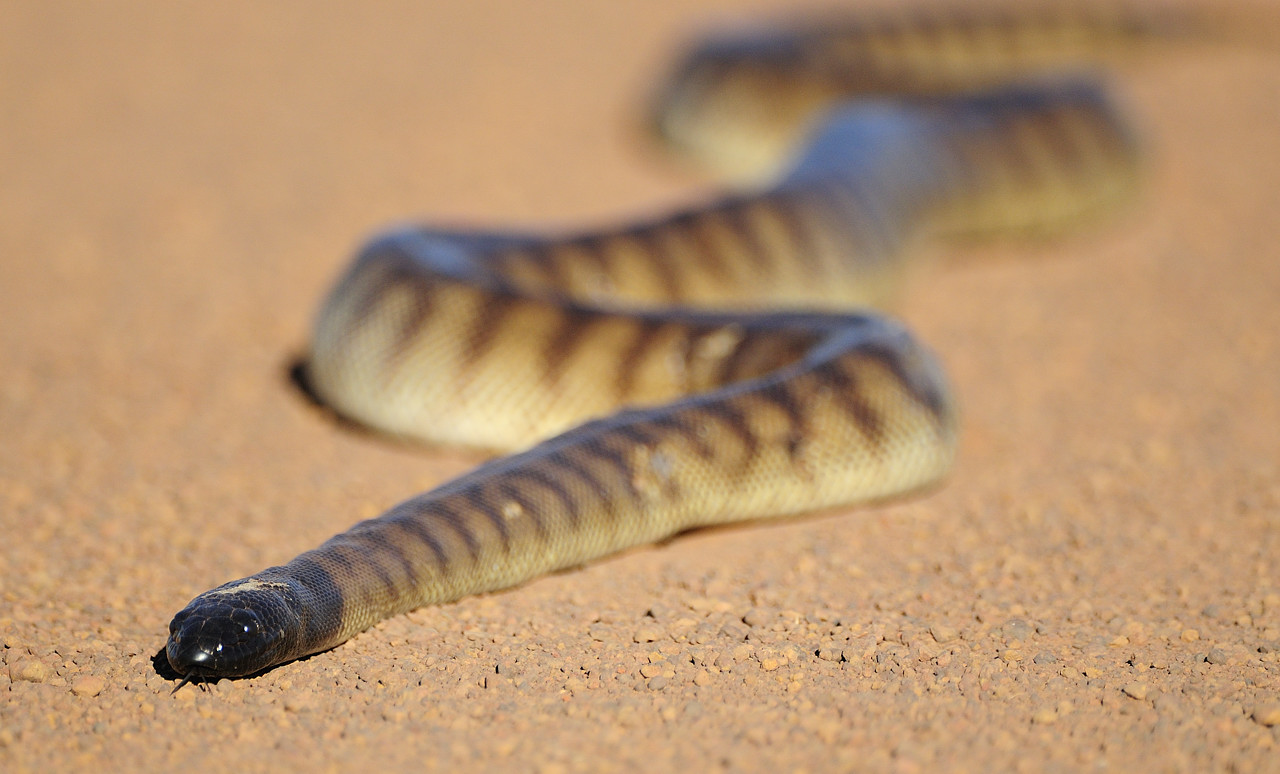
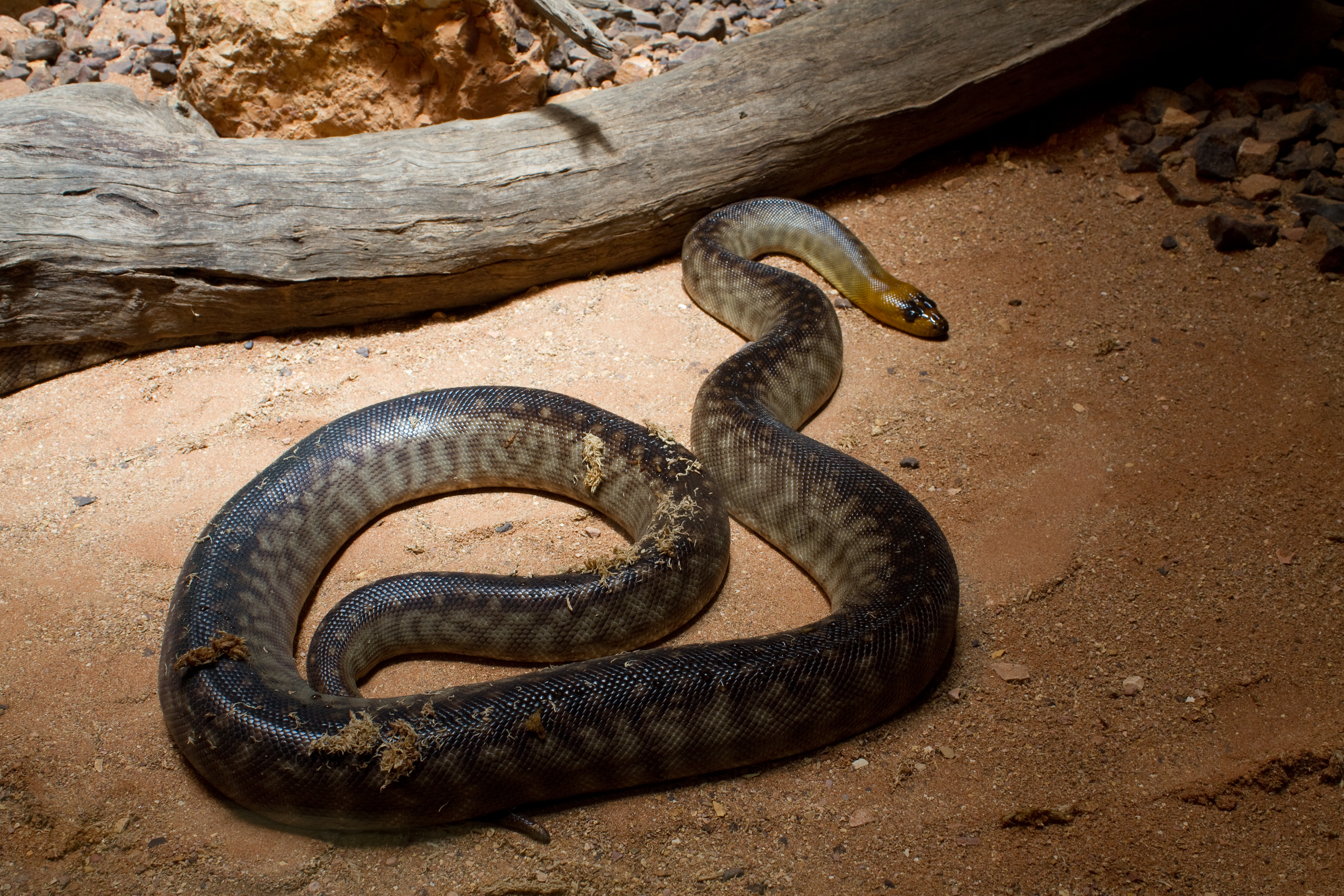
Species	Taxon author	Common name	Geographic range
A. melanocephalus^{T}	(Krefft, 1864)	Black-headed python	Australia in the northern half of the country, excluding the very arid regions.
A. ramsayi	(Macleay, 1882)	Woma python	Australia in the west and center of the country: from Western Australia through southern Northern Territory and northern South Australia to southern Queensland and northwestern New South Wales. Its range may be discontinuous.

^{T}) Type species.

== Taxonomy ==
Two new subspecies, A. ramsayi panoptes, the western woma python, and A. r. richardjonesii, the desert woma python, were described by Hoser (2001). However, these descriptions are questionable, as they do not include proper diagnoses and seem to be based only on distribution.
