= Brown snake =

Brown snake may refer to:

- species of the genus Pseudonaja, highly venomous snakes endemic to Australia
- species of the genus Rhadinaea, the graceful brown snakes, snakes endemic to North America and Central America
- species of the genus Rhadinella, the graceful brown snakes, snakes endemic to North America and Central America
- the genus Sordellina, a monotypic genus with its sole representative, the dotted brown snake, Sordellina punctata, endemic to Brazil
- species of the genus Storeria, snakes endemic to North America and Central America
- King brown snake (Pseudechis australis), a highly venomous Australian snake of the family Elapidae
