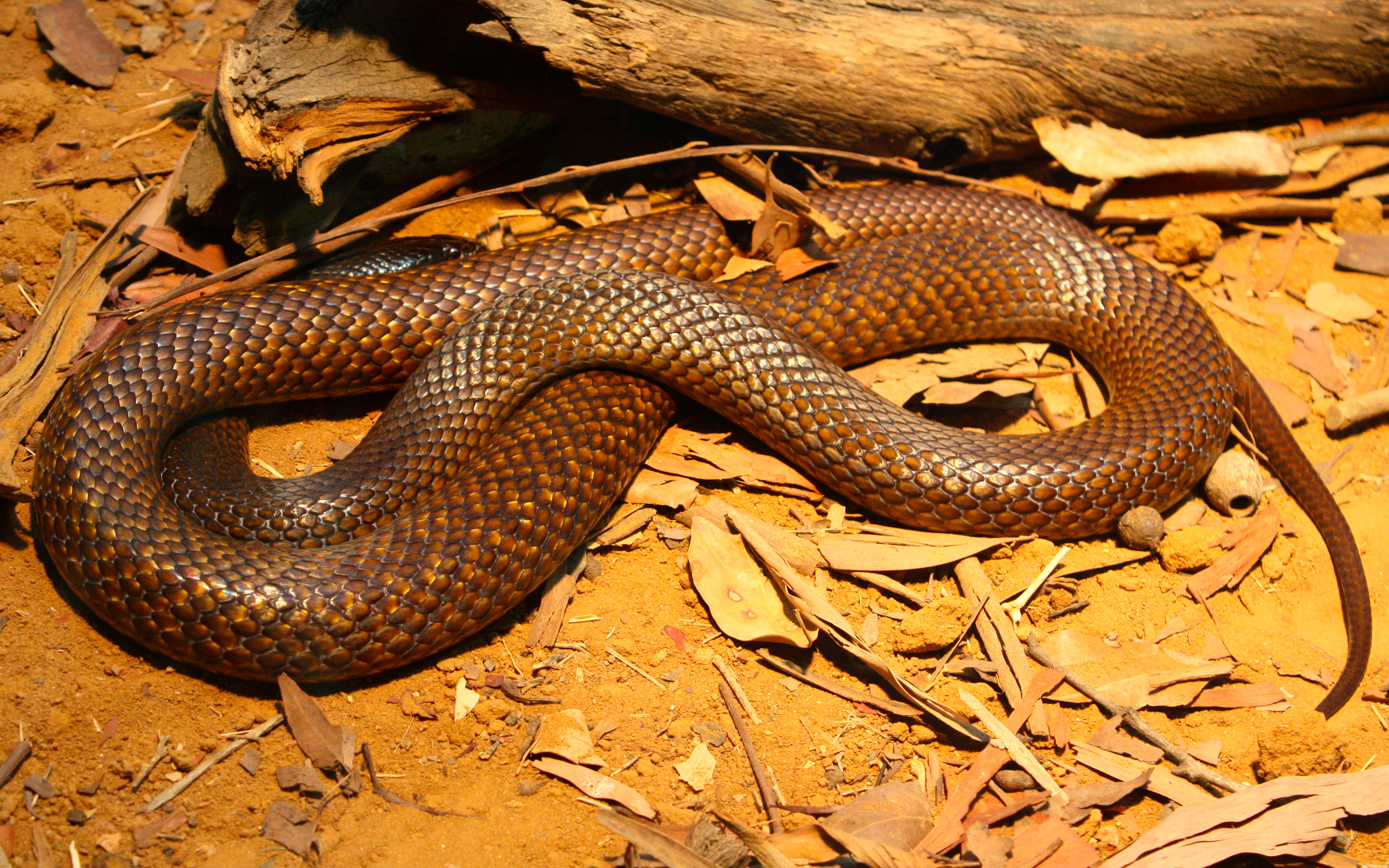
- A northern brown snake at the Australia Zoo

Conservation status
- Data Deficient (IUCN 3.1)

Scientific classification
- Kingdom: Animalia
- Phylum: Chordata
- Class: Reptilia
- Order: Squamata
- Suborder: Serpentes
- Family: Elapidae
- Genus: Pseudonaja
- Species: P. nuchalis

Binomial name
- Pseudonaja nuchalis Günther, 1858

= Pseudonaja nuchalis =

Highly venomous snake native to Australia

Pseudonaja nuchalis, the northern brown snake or gwardar, is a species of very fast, highly venomous elapid snake native to Australia. Its colour and pattern are rather variable, depending largely on its location.

The name gwardar is a word meaning "go the long way around" in an Aboriginal language. This may be regarded as advice for people who come across the species in the wild: that is, while P. nuchalis is generally cautious, shy, and inclined to retreat rather than attack, it will defend itself if cornered.

== Description ==
The northern brown snake grows up to 1.8 m (5 ft 10.87 in) in total length (including tail). Its back can feature shades of orange-brown with flecks and bands, or appear plain. Its belly is cream to orange with pink blotches. Some individuals have jet black heads (this can cause it to be confused with the black-headed python), while others feature a black 'V' shape on the back of their neck, below their head.

== Distribution and habitat ==
The northern brown snake has a wide distribution and is found across the north of the Australian continent, including the Northern Territory, Queensland and Western Australia.

The northern brown snake is a ground-dwelling snake that prefers drier habitats, but is also found in coastal eucalypt forests, woodlands, and grasslands. Although the northern brown is not an arboreal species, it is not uncommon for it to climb small shrubs or trees. It also hides in crevices and under rocks, and in urban areas can be found under rubbish or tin piles.

== Diet ==
Pseudonaja nuchalis preys upon small mammals and reptiles, including lizards and mice.

== Lifespan and reproduction ==
Little is known about the northern brown snake's lifespan. Mating season is roughly from September to November and the female usually produces around 11-14 eggs, but may produce up to 38.

== Venom and symptoms ==
Although the northern brown snake's venom is not the most toxic in the brown snake genus, its average delivery contains a relatively high quantity of venom; thus the northern brown snake has high potential to deliver a deadly bite. Its venom contains neurotoxins, nephrotoxins, and a procoagulant, although humans are not usually affected by the neurotoxins. The bite is usually painless and difficult to see due to their small fangs. Human symptoms of a northern brown snake bite are headache, nausea/vomiting, abdominal pain, severe coagulopathy, and sometimes kidney damage. In dogs and cats, paralysis is also likely to occur.

== Behaviour ==
The northern brown snake is known to be very aggressive when disturbed or threatened, but like most snakes, usually prefers to retreat from danger. It may develop nocturnal habits during the warmer months, but is otherwise active during the day and enjoys sunlight. The snake has also been known to practise cannibalism, although this is not common. Northern brown snakes kill their prey with a combination of venom and constriction.
