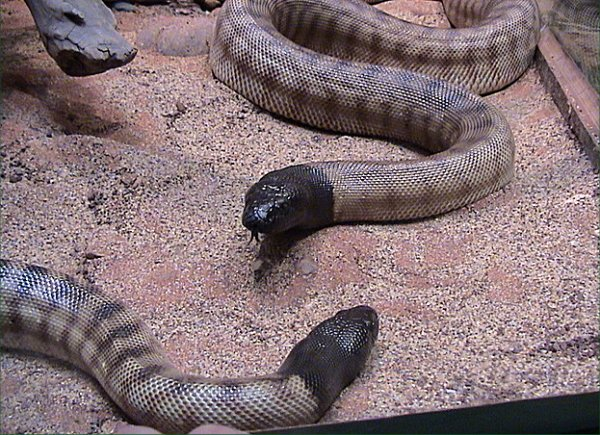

Conservation status
- Least Concern (IUCN 3.1)

Scientific classification
- Kingdom: Animalia
- Phylum: Chordata
- Class: Reptilia
- Order: Squamata
- Suborder: Serpentes
- Family: Pythonidae
- Genus: Aspidites
- Species: A. melanocephalus

Binomial name
- Aspidites melanocephalus (Krefft, 1864)
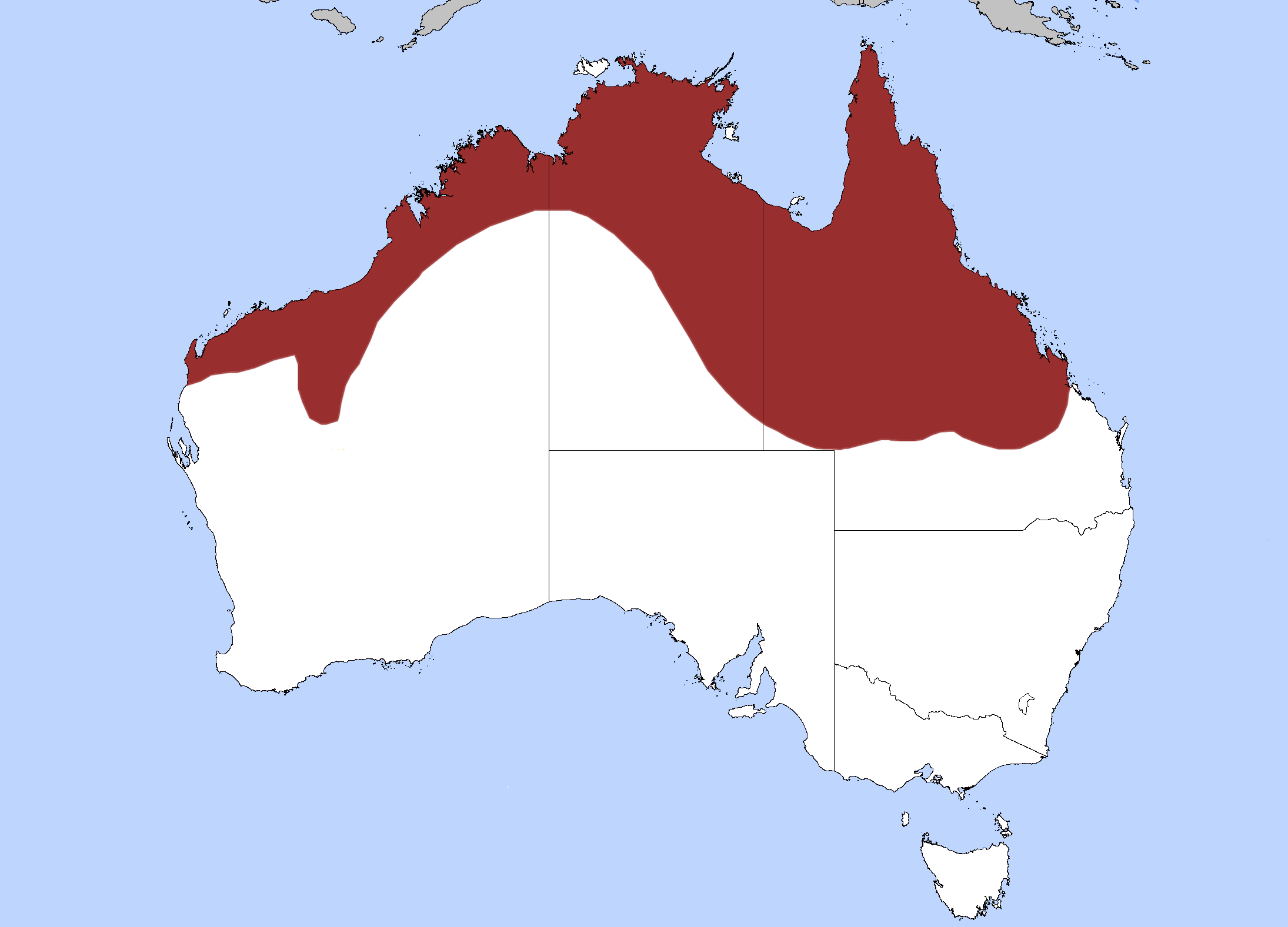
- Distribution of the black-headed python

Synonyms
- Aspidiotes melanocephalus Krefft, 1864; Aspidites melanocephalus — Boulenger, 1893; Aspidites melanocephalus melanocephalus — Loveridge, 1934; Aspidites melanocephalus melanocephalus — Stull, 1935; Aspidites melanocephalus — H.G. Cogger, Cameron & H.M. Cogger, 1983

= Black-headed python =

Species of snake

The black-headed python (Aspidites melanocephalus) is a species of snake in the family Pythonidae (the python family). The species is endemic to Australia. There are no subspecies that are recognized as being valid.

== Description ==
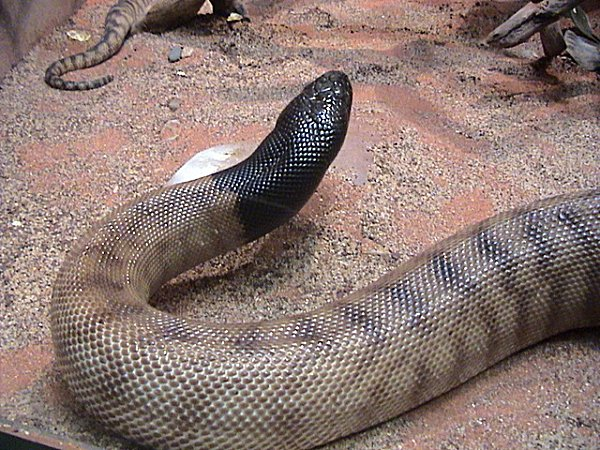
A. melanocephalus at the Cameron Park Zoo.

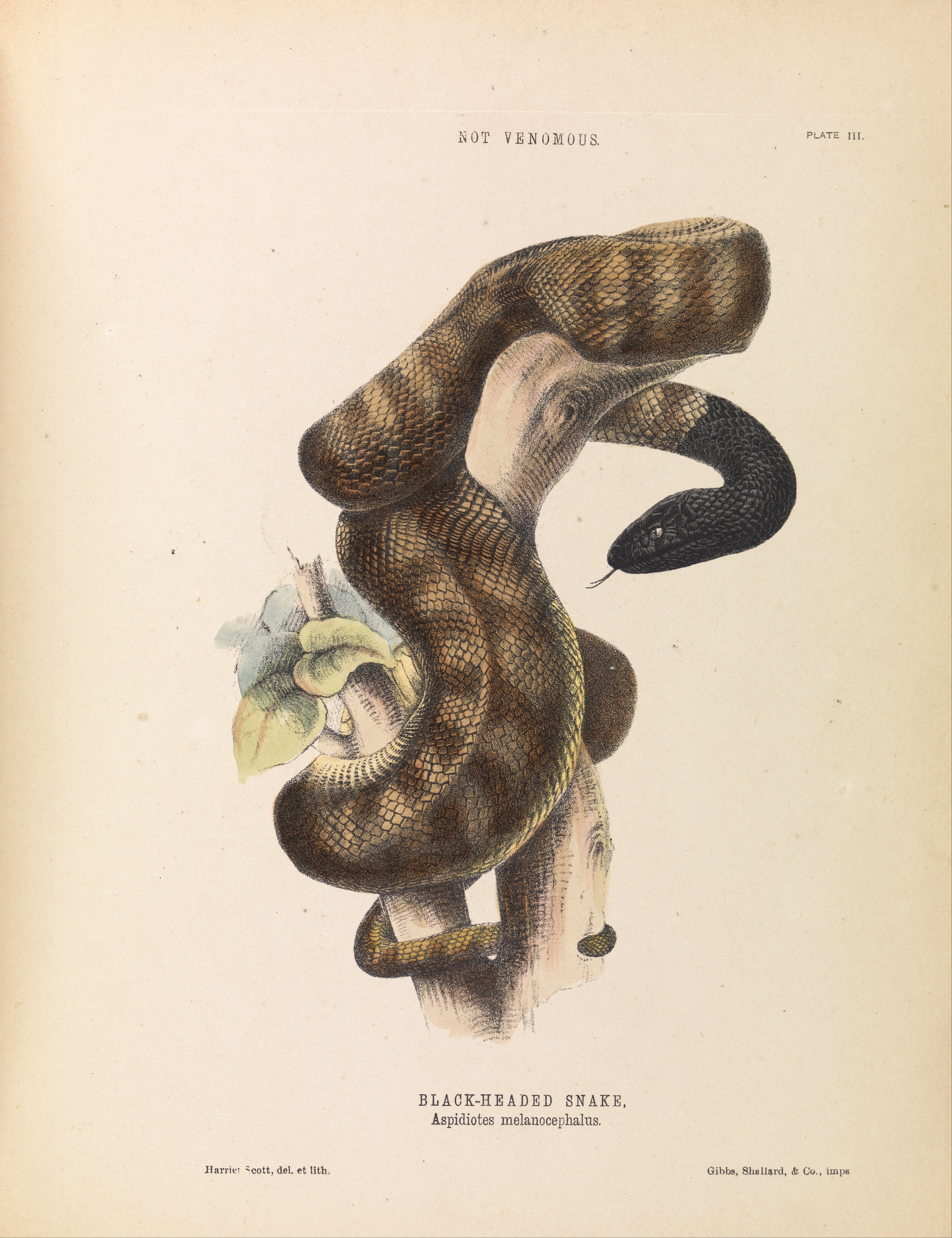
Illustration by artist Harriet Scott

Adults of A. melanocephalus typically grow to 1.5–2 m (4.9–6.6 ft) in length (including tail), but can grow to a maximum length of 3.5 m (11 ft). The body is muscular with a flattened profile, while the tail tapers to a thin point.

The top of the head is covered by large symmetrical scales. The dorsal scales, which are smooth and glossy, number 50-65 rows at midbody, while 315-355 ventral scales occur. The tail has 60-75 mainly single subcaudal scales and the anal scale is single. The posterior subcaudals tend to be divided, often irregularly.

The color pattern consists of shades of black, dark grey, brown, gold, and cream arranged in a banded or brindled pattern. The belly is light-colored, flecked with darker spots. The head is shiny black that also extends down the neck and throat for several inches.

== Distribution and habitat ==
The species A. melanocephalus is found in Australia, in the northern half of the country, excluding the very arid regions. The type locality given is "Port Denison Bowen", Queensland, Australia. It occurs in humid tropical to semiarid conditions.

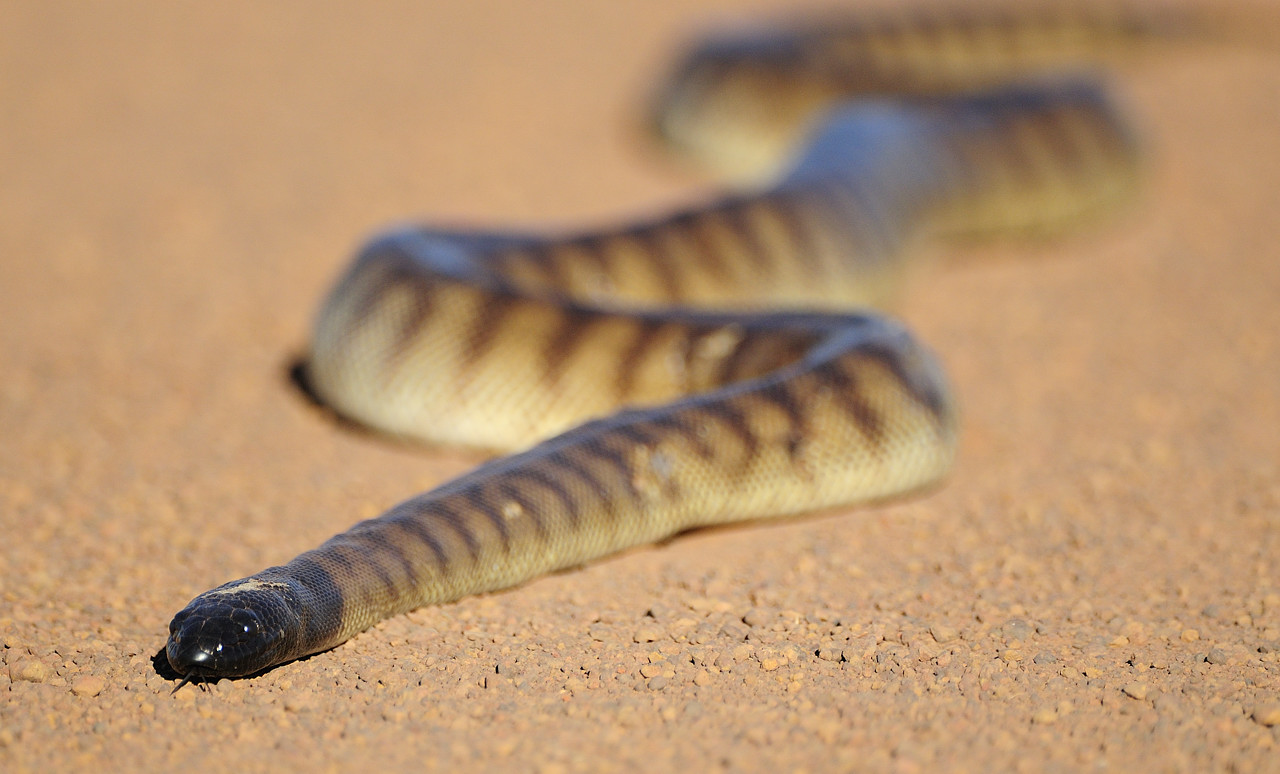
A black-headed python seeking warmth on a road near Borroloola on a cold morning

== Behavior ==
A. melanocephalus is terrestrial and is often found amongst rocks and loose debris. If disturbed, it hisses loudly, but is unlikely to bite unless hunting prey. It sometimes strikes with a closed mouth, but generally can be handled easily. It is a strong swimmer, but is almost never found in water. It is not venomous.

== Feeding ==
The diet of A. melanocephalus consists mainly of reptiles, including snakes, but it will eat mammals and some birds if available. Skinks are the primary prey of the black-headed python. Other important prey include geckos, bearded dragons, legless lizards and the perentie, the largest monitor lizard native to Australia, as well as other black-headed pythons. When ingesting large prey, it positions one or two coils just ahead of its distended mouth and by constriction makes the task of swallowing easier.

== Reproduction ==
A. melanocephalus is oviparous. Adult females lay five to 10 eggs per clutch. The females stay coiled about the eggs and incubate them until they hatch, which is usually after 2–3 months. The young take small prey as soon as two days after hatching. Immature individuals are vulnerable to predation. Adults have no natural predators other than dingos and humans.

== Captivity ==
Due to its docile nature and striking color pattern, A. melanocephalus has become very desirable as an exotic pet. It is bred in captivity and can be relatively easily obtained, but does command a high price. As it can be a muscular snake and reaches a fairly substantial size, prospective owners should consider a suitable enclosure, as well as temperature and feeding requirements.

== In human culture ==
A. melanocephalus is mentioned in, or plays a central role in, the stories of the Indigenous Australians Dreamtime tradition.
