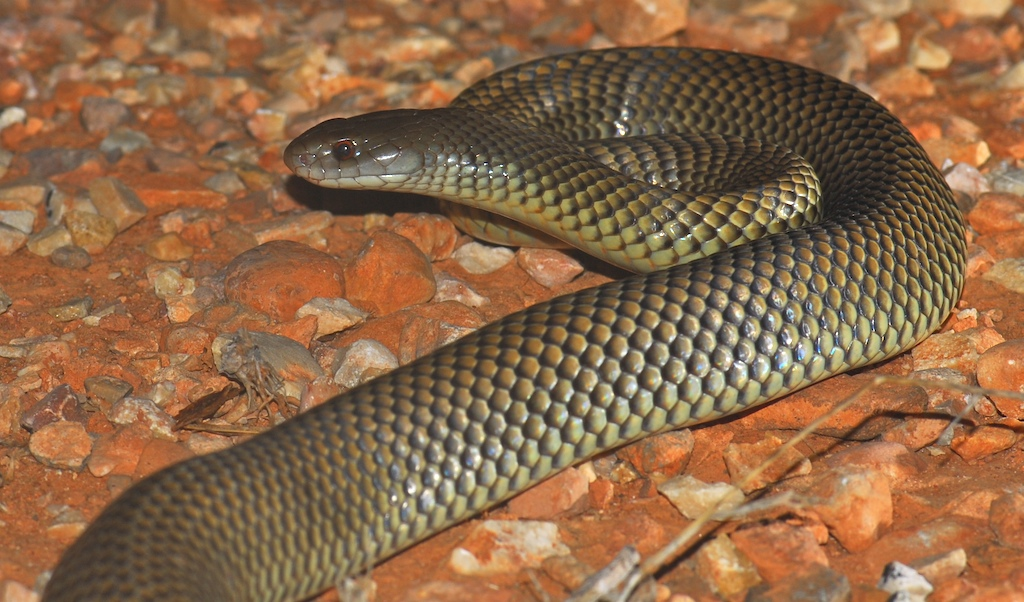

Conservation status
- Least Concern (IUCN 3.1)

Scientific classification
- Kingdom: Animalia
- Phylum: Chordata
- Class: Reptilia
- Order: Squamata
- Suborder: Serpentes
- Family: Elapidae
- Genus: Pseudechis
- Species: P. australis

Binomial name
- Pseudechis australis (Gray, 1842)
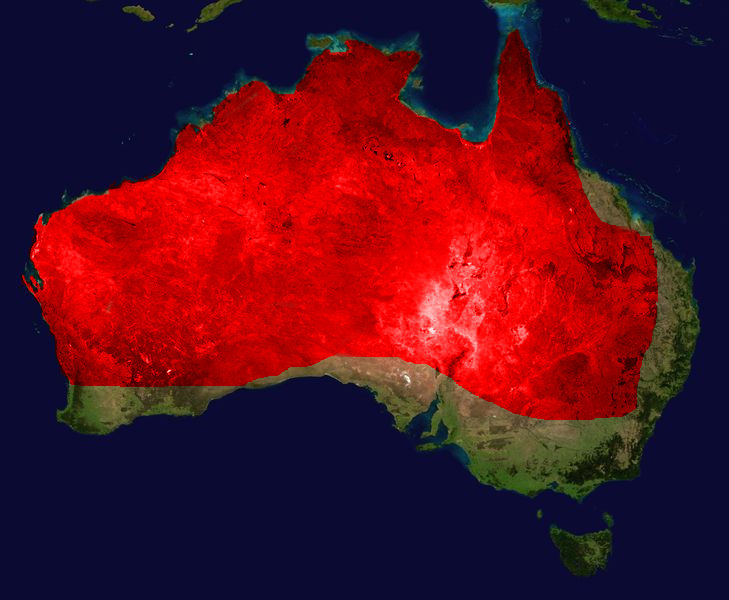
- Range of king brown snake (in red)

Synonyms
- List: Naja australis Gray, 1842; Pseudechis darwiniensis Macleay, 1878; Pseudechis cupreus Boulenger, 1896; Pseudechis platycephalus Thomson, 1933; Denisonia brunnea Mitchell, 1951; Cannia centralis Wells & Wellington, 1985

= King brown snake =

Highly venomous snake native to Australia

The king brown snake (Pseudechis australis) is a species of highly venomous snake of the family Elapidae, native to northern, western, and Central Australia. The king brown snake is the largest terrestrial venomous snake in Australia. Despite its common name, it is a member of the genus Pseudechis (black snakes) and only distantly related to true brown snakes. Its alternative common name is the mulga snake, although it lives in many habitats apart from mulga. First described by English zoologist John Edward Gray in 1842, it is a robust snake up to 3.3 m (11 ft) long. It is variable in appearance, with individuals from northern Australia having tan upper parts, while those from southern Australia are dark brown to blackish. Sometimes, it is seen in a reddish-green texture. The dorsal scales are two-toned, sometimes giving the snake a patterned appearance. Its underside is cream or white, often with orange splotches. The species is oviparous. The snake is considered to be a least-concern species according to the International Union for Conservation of Nature, though may have declined with the spread of the cane toad.

Its venom is not as potent as those of Australia's other dangerous snakes, but can still cause severe effects if delivered in large enough quantities. Its main effect is on striated muscle tissue, causing paralysis from muscle damage, and also commonly affects blood clotting (coagulopathy). Often, extensive pain and swelling occur, rarely with necrosis, at the bite site. Deaths from its bites have been recorded, with the most recent being in 1969. Its victims are treated with black snake (not brown snake) antivenom.

== Taxonomy ==
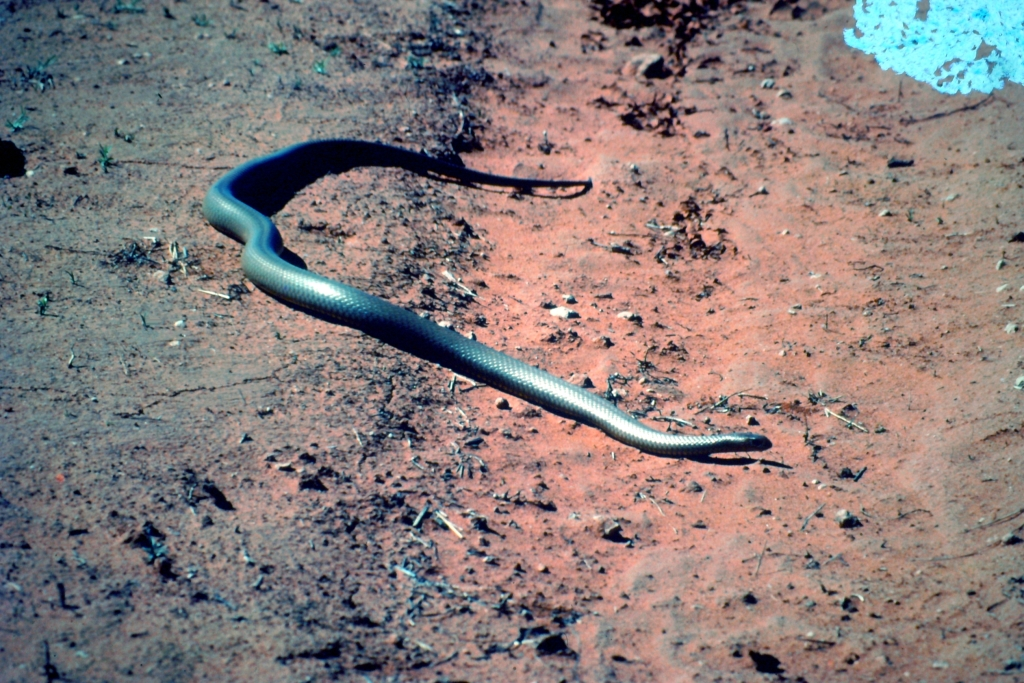
King brown snake on roadside near Tibooburra

The species was first described by English zoologist John Edward Gray in 1842 from a specimen collected at Port Essington in the Northern Territory. Gray saw little distinction from the Egyptian cobra (Naja haje) in his single preserved specimen—excepting the variation in ocular plates—and assigned the name Naja australis. On obtaining a second specimen from the College of Surgeons, Albert Günther of the British Museum recognised an affinity with the Australian species described as Pseudechis porphyriacus, resulting in the current combination as Pseudechis australis in the black snake genus Pseudechis. Scottish-Australian naturalist William Macleay described Pseudechis darwiniensis in 1878, from a more slender specimen that he thought was distinct from P. australis. Belgian-British zoologist George Albert Boulenger described P. cupreus in 1896 from a specimen collected from the Murray River, distinguishing P. darwiniensis from P. australis by the shape of the frontal scale. Austrian zoologist Franz Werner described Pseudechis denisonioides from Eradu, Western Australia in 1909. Australian naturalist Donald Thomson obtained a skull of a large specimen with a wide head collected from East Alligator River in Arnhem Land in 1914, naming it Pseudechis platycephalus in 1933. He distinguished it from P. australis on the basis of it having anteriorly grooved palatine and pterygoid teeth, and having blunt ridges and keels on the dorsal scales.

In 1955, Australian herpetologist Roy D. Mackay concluded that several species previously described were synonymous with P. australis, recognising that it was a highly variable taxon. He noted that P. australis had frontal scales of variable shape, and that grooves were present on the teeth of many specimens of Pseudechis, so these features did not support separate species. Australian herpetologists Richard W. Wells and C. Ross Wellington described Cannia centralis in 1985 from a 1.3 m (4 ft 3 in) specimen collected 8 km (5 mi) north of Tennant Creek in 1977, distinguishing it on the basis of a narrow head; however, the distinction was not supported by other authors. Two new species and a new genus have been described within this complex by Australian snake-handler Raymond Hoser—the eastern dwarf mulga snake (P. pailsei) from near Mount Isa, Queensland, Australia, and the Papuan pygmy mulga snake (P. rossignolii), found in Irian Jaya. Hoser later also resurrected the pygmy mulga snake (P. weigeli, originally described as Cannia weigeli by Wells and Wellington in 1987). These descriptions were initially received with skepticism due to the low level of evidence provided in the original descriptions.

The species was long regarded as monotypic and highly variable until German biologist Ulrich Kuch and colleagues analysed the mitochondrial DNA of specimens across its range in 2005. They recovered four distinct lineages (clades); clade I (a New Guinea lineage of smaller snakes) diverged from the rest between six and four million years ago (Late Miocene to Early Pliocene), with the other three diverging in the Pleistocene. Clade II corresponded to a lineage of large snakes found across Australia, clade III was a dwarf form from the Kimberley, and clade IV contained two dwarf forms from northwestern Queensland and the Northern Territory, each of which was likely to be a distinct species. In 2017, British herpetologist Simon Maddock and colleagues published a genetic analysis using mitochondrial DNA on the genus, and confirmed clade I was P. rossignoli, clade II was P. australis, clade III is an as yet unnamed dwarf species, and clade IV is P. pailsi and P. weigeli. They also determined that P. australis was most closely related to P. butleri, the spotted mulga snake.

Australian medical researcher Struan Sutherland pointed out that the name "king brown snake" is a problem, as its venom is not neutralised by brown snake antivenom, which could endanger snake bite victims; he recommended dropping the name and the old term "Darwin brown snake", and using "mulga snake", instead. Further complicating the issue, the term "king brown snake" has been applied to any large brown snake. Australian snake expert Glenn Shea has also pointed out that "mulga snake" has issues in that the species lives in a wide range of habitats in addition to mulga. It has also been called the "Pilbara cobra". Australian zoologist Gerard Krefft called it the orange-bellied brown snake. In the Kaytetye language spoken in Central Australia, it is known as atetherr-ayne-wene, "budgerigar-eater". The term "king brown" refers to the great size of individuals in the north and northwest of Australia, which can exceed 3 m (10 ft) in length; it is the largest and most dangerous elapid of those regions. In Southwest Australia, where the species is up to 2 m (6 ft 7 in), it is also known as the common mulga snake, distinguishing it from the spotted mulga snake Pseudechis butleri.

== Description ==
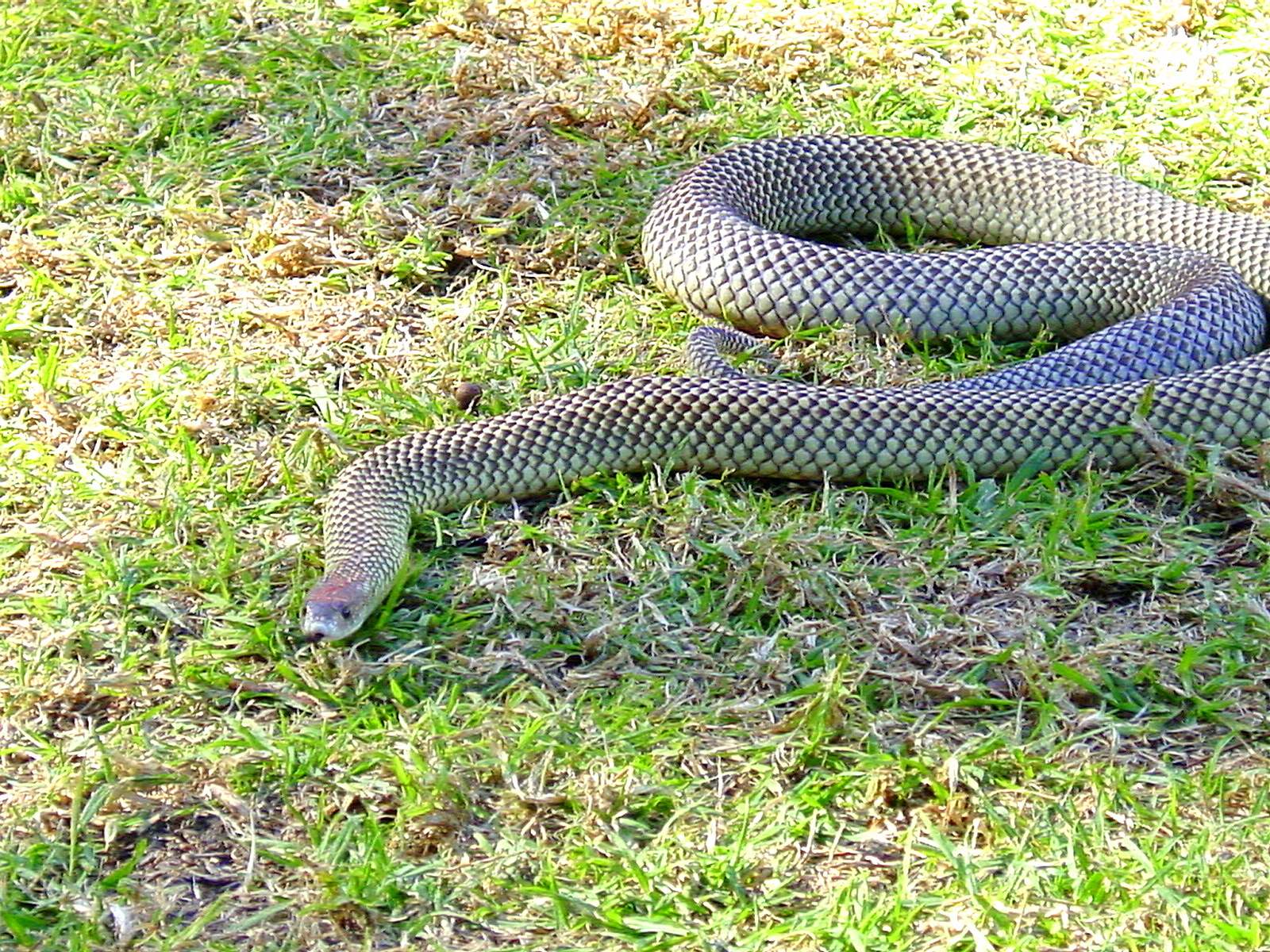
Adult snake with prominent two-toned scales giving a reticulated pattern

Australia's largest venomous snake, the king brown snake can reach 2.0 to 2.5 m (6.6 to 8.2 ft) in length with a weight of 3 to 6 kg (6.6 to 13.2 lb), with males around 20% larger than females. The longest confirmed individual was 3.3 m (11 ft) in length. The king brown snake is robust, with a head slightly wider than the body, prominent cheeks and small eyes with red-brown irises, and a dark tongue. The head is demarcated from the body by a slight neck. Scales on the upper-parts, flanks and tail are two toned—pale or greenish yellow at the base and various shades of tan or copper, or all shades of brown from pale to blackish towards the rear. This gives the snake a reticulated pattern. The tail is often darker, while the crown is the same colour as the body. The belly is cream, white or salmon and can have orange marks.

The colours of the snakes' upper parts and sides differ from area to area within their range; those from northern Australia are tan, those from deserts in Central Australia have prominent white marks on each scale, giving a patterned appearance, and those from southern parts of its range are darker, even blackish. In Western Australia, king brown snakes south of a line through Jurien Bay, Badgingarra, New Norcia, and Quairading are significantly darker in colour.

=== Scalation ===
The number and arrangement of scales on a snake's body are key elements of identification to species level. The king brown snake has 17 rows of dorsal scales at mid-body, 185 to 225 ventral scales, 50 to 75 subcaudal scales (all undivided, or anterior ones undivided and posterior divided, or all divided), and a divided anal scale. The temporolabial scale and last (sixth) supralabial scale (both above the snake's mouth) are fused in the eastern brown snake (Pseudonaja textilis) but separate in the king brown snake.

The king brown snake can be confused with brown snakes of the genus Pseudonaja, the olive python (Liasis olivaceus), water python (Liasis fuscus), spotted mulga snake, or coastal taipan (Oxyuranus scutellatus) where they co-occur.

== Distribution and habitat ==
King brown snakes occur in all states of Australia except for Victoria and Tasmania. It has become rare or vanished from parts of coastal Queensland. The eastern limit of its range runs from Gladstone in central Queensland, and south through Gayndah, Dalby, the Warrumbungles, southwest to Condobolin and the vicinity of Balranald and then across to Port Pirie in South Australia. The southwestern limit of its range runs from Ceduna in South Australia, west through the northern Nullarbor Plain to Kalgoorlie, Narrogin and on coastal plains north of Perth.

King brown snakes are habitat generalists, inhabiting woodlands, hummock grasslands, chenopod scrublands, and gibber or sandy deserts nearly devoid of vegetation. Within the arid to semiarid parts of their range, however, they prefer areas of greater moisture such as watercourses.

They are often observed at modified habitats such as wheat fields, rubbish piles, and vacated buildings; individuals may become trapped in mine shafts and wellbores. Fieldwork near Alice Springs showed that they prefer areas with buffel grass (Cenchrus ciliaris), a common introduced weed in Central Australia, possibly because of the dense, year-round cover it provides.

== Behaviour ==
The king brown snake is mostly crepuscular—active at dusk, and is less active during the middle of the day and between midnight and dawn, retiring to crevices in the soil, old animal burrows, or under rocks or logs. During warmer months, its activity shifts to later after dusk and into the evening. Across its range, it is more active during the day in cooler climates and at night in hotter climates.

=== Reproduction ===
The breeding season begins with males engaging in wrestling combat, each attempting to push the other over for the right to mate with a female. Mating follows—in the early Southern Hemisphere spring in southwest Western Australia, mid-spring in the Eyre Peninsula, and with the wet season in the north of the country. The species is oviparous, with one unverified claim of viviparity. Females produce a clutch of four to 19 eggs, averaging around 10, with longer females laying larger clutches, generally 39 to 45 days after mating has taken place. Eggs take about 70 to 100 days to hatch. The incubating temperature has been recorded as between 22 and 32 °C (72 and 90 °F). The eggs average 40.1 mm (1 5/8 in) in length by 22.9 mm (7/8 in) in width and weigh 13.1 g (0.46 oz) each. Baby snakes average 22.6 cm (8 7/8 in) in length and weigh 9.4 g (0.33 oz) on hatching.

King brown snakes have been reported to live up to 25 years in captivity.

== Diet ==
The king brown snake is a generalist predator, preying on frogs, lizards including small monitors, skinks, geckos and agamids, other snakes including whip snakes, brown snakes, the brown tree snake (Boiga irregularis), southern shovel-nosed snake (Brachyurophis semifasciatus), Gould's hooded snake (Parasuta gouldii) and crowned snake (Elapognathus coronatus), birds such as thornbills, and small mammals such as rodents and dasyurids. And spiders such as tarantulas, mouse spiders, and the infamous funnel-web spiders. The species has been reported eating roadkill, as well as the sloughed skins of other reptiles, and is known to exhibit cannibalism. Specimens in captivity have been observed eating their own faeces. It is opportunistic, eating a higher proportion of frogs in wetter areas.

King brown snakes are sensitive to cane toad toxins and have died after eating them. Despite this, field research before and after the arrival of cane toads to the Adelaide River floodplain in the Northern Territory did not show a decline in king brown snake numbers, though this could have been coincidental; the population of this species had already declined in the region.

== Venom ==
The king brown snake accounted for 4% of identified snakebites in Australia between 2005 and 2015, with no deaths recorded. The last recorded death occurred in 1969, when a 20-year-old man was bitten while reaching around for a packet of cigarettes under his bed in Three Springs, Western Australia. The man was treated over two days, with twice daily injections of death adder, brown snake and tiger snake antivenin, yet died in 37 hours despite this medical attention. This incident led to the introduction of Papuan black snake antivenom for treatment of king brown snake envenomation. Before this it had been confirmed in one fatality and suspected in another in the early 1960s. Venomous snakes normally only bite humans when disturbed. King brown snakes have been noted, however, to bite people who were asleep at the time. Furthermore, a significant number of victims have been snake handlers. These have resulted in a high proportion of bites occurring on upper limbs. The king brown snake is classified as a snake of medical importance by the World Health Organization. (Note: Snakes of Medical Importance include those with highly dangerous venom resulting in high rates of morbidity and mortality, or those that are common agents in snakebite.)

The king brown snake can bite repeatedly and chew to envenomate a victim. Considerable pain, swelling, and tissue damage often occur at the site of a king brown snake bite. Local necrosis has been recorded. In 1998, a person bitten 9–12 times on his arm required an amputation of the envenomed limb. He reported later that he had impulsively decided to commit suicide by placing his hand in a bag with a king brown snake inside and stirring it up. A large king brown snake delivers on average 180 mg of venom in one bite. A 2.5 m (8 ft 2 in) long king brown snake milked by snake handler John Cann produced 1350 mg, and then 580, 920, and 780 mg at three, four, and five months after the first milking. This record was broken in 2016, when a king brown snake named "Chewie"—also 2.5 m (8 ft 2 in) long—produced 1500 mg of venom at the Australian Reptile Park. The volume of venom produced in laboratories is equivalent to the amounts produced by the king cobra (Ophiophagus hannah) and Gaboon viper (Bitis gabonica). In a laboratory experiment on mice, not only did the king brown snake inject far more venom than other species of dangerous snake, very little of its venom (0.07 mg of 62 mg) was left on the skin. When using 0.1% bovine serum albumin in saline rather than saline alone, the venom has a murine median lethal dose (LD_{50}) of 1.91 mg/kg (0.866 mg/lb) when administered subcutaneously.

The main toxic agents of king brown snake venom are myotoxins hazardous to striated muscles and kidney cells. Toxic effects are proportional to the amount of venom in the victim. Nonspecific symptoms of poisoning are common and include nausea and vomiting, abdominal pain, diarrhea, generalized sweating (diaphoresis), and headache. Impaired clotting (coagulopathy) is common, and can be diagnosed with an elevated activated partial thromboplastin time (aPTT). Symptoms of myotoxicity (muscle damage) include muscle pain and weakness in the presence of an elevated creatine kinase (CK). King brown snake venom has some haemolytic activity, and some patients get a short-term fall in red blood cells.

A major component of king brown snake venom are phospholipase A2 enzymes, which have diverse effects that are commonly found in snake venoms. These proteins are directly toxic on muscle tissue due to their sheer volume in the venom, and are destructive to cell membranes and liberate lysophospholipids (involved in cell lysis) and arachidonate (a precursor in inflammatory response). Their venom can lead to rhabdomyolysis. Despite containing a number of agents with phospholipase A2 activity, king brown snake venom exhibits little neurotoxicity.

The venom has multiple proteins with antibiotic activity, including two L-amino-acid oxidases (LAO1 and LAO2) that exhibit activity against the pathogenic bacterium Aeromonas hydrophila, which is commonly present in frogs. Also present are three protein isoforms of transferrin; transferrin binds serum iron (Fe^{3+}), which makes the environment less hospitable for bacteria and hence has an antibiotic effect. Pseudechetoxin and pseudecin are two proteins that block cyclic nucleotide–gated ion channels, including those present in retinal photoreceptors and olfactory receptor neurons.

=== Treatment ===
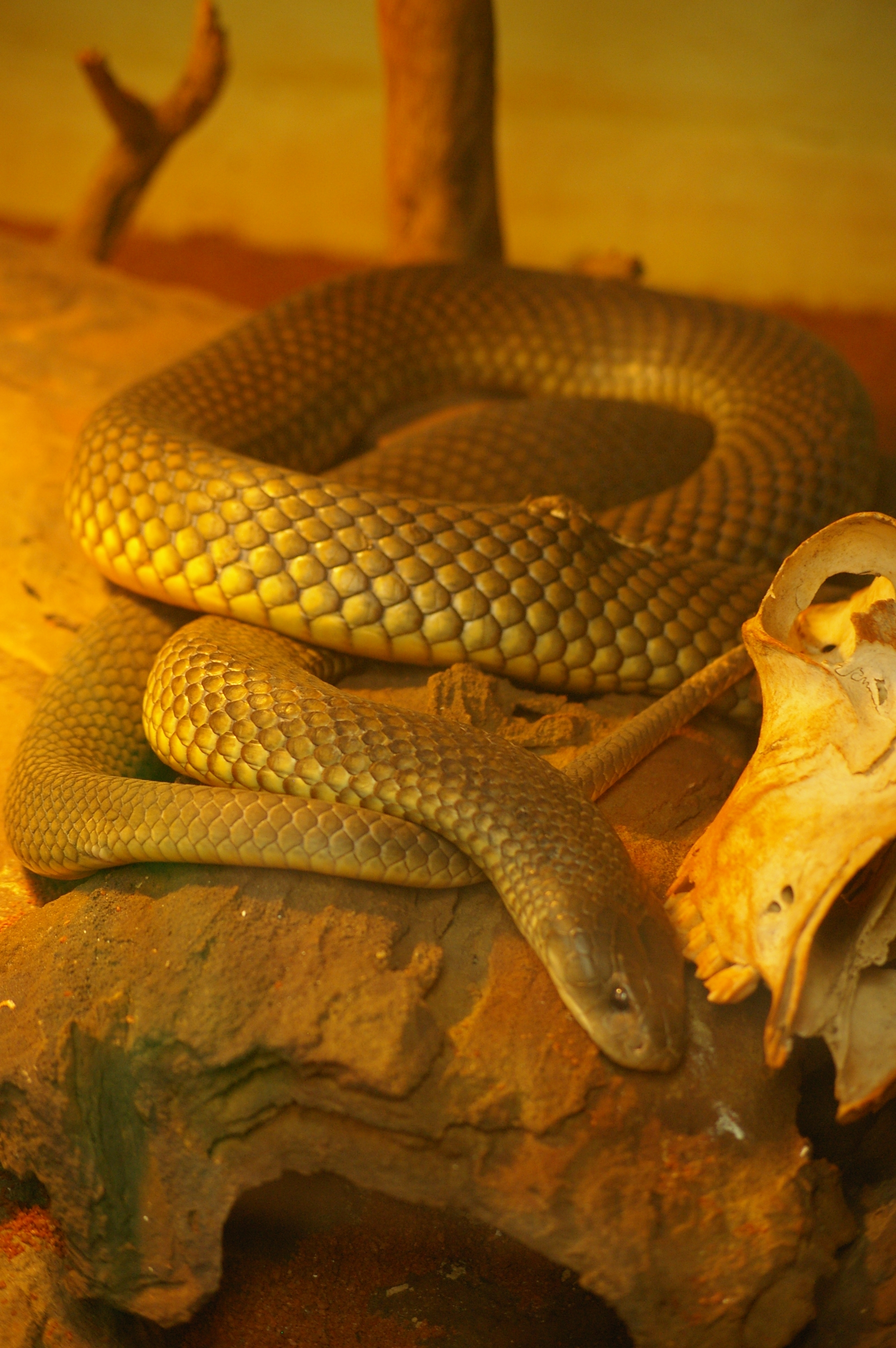
King brown snake at the Armadale Reptile Centre

Standard first-aid treatment for any suspected bite from a venomous snake uses a pressure bandage to the bite site. The victims should move as little as possible and be conveyed to a hospital or clinic, where they should be monitored for at least 24 hours. The tetanus vaccine is given, though the mainstay of treatment is the administration of the appropriate antivenom. Black-snake antivenom is used to treat bites from this species. Christopher Johnston and colleagues propose giving antivenom immediately if king brown snake envenoming is suspected, as a delay of more than two hours did not prevent muscle damage in a review of treated snakebite victims. They add that it is reasonable to assume that if a snakebite victim had a raised aPTT and signs of haemolysis, then a king brown snake is the culprit. Shahab Razavi and colleagues add that more than one vial of antivenom might be needed if envenoming is severe.

== Captivity ==
King brown snakes are readily available in Australia via breeding in captivity. They are regarded as straightforward to keep, due to the low likelihood of biting and relatively low toxicity of their venom, though the potentially large amount injected makes it more hazardous.

== Conservation and threats ==
The king brown snake is considered to be a least-concern species according to the International Union for Conservation of Nature. Small snakes may be eaten by birds of prey. In contrast, old snakes are frequently infested with ticks.

== Culture ==
Mutitjulu Waterhole at Uluru marks the site of the battle between two Central Australian ancestral beings Kuniya (woma python woman) and Liru (king brown snake man). Here, Kuniya avenged the death of her nephew, who was fatally speared by Liru, by striking him with her digging stick.

Among the Djambarrpuyngu clan of the Yolngu people in northeastern Arnhem Land, King Brown Snake is the Ngurruyurrtjurr ancestor, and its homeland is Flinders Point in Arnhem Land.

Known as darrpa to indigenous people of East Arnhem land, the king brown snake was historically responsible for deaths there. Folk treatment involved capturing the snake and watching it bleed, which would supposedly make the victim recover. If the snake were killed, its victim would die also. Another folk remedy involved blowing smoke through a hollow branch or pandanus leaf onto the victim sitting by a campfire. If the smoke resembled the mali, or immaterial form, of a snake, then the person would die, as the victim of a ragalk (sorcerer).

In Kunwinjku country in West Arnhem Land, the king brown snake is known as dadbe. The Kurulk clan would not collect white paint from a site in the wet season, as they believed it was the snake's faeces, and they were afraid of its anger.

Kurrmurnnyini is a lagoon and complex of sandstone outcrops near Borroloola in the southwestern Gulf Country in the Northern Territory. Here the King Brown Snake Ancestral Being—balngarrangarra in Gudanji and ngulwa in Yanyuwa—was sleeping about 1.5 km (0.93 mi) north of the lagoon when it was disturbed by ngabaya—ancestral spirit men. Angrily, he bit the rocks, which became tainted and poisonous, and an instrument of narnu‐bulabula (sorcery). Local sorcerers would cast a spell by inserting a potential victim's item of clothing in a hole in the rock or sharpening a stick and calling out their name while inserting it in the rock face. The victim would then perish. Only men descended from King Brown Snake Ancestor could be sorcerers, though others might hire them. Local people feared and avoided the location.

The title character picks up a king brown snake in the 1986 film Crocodile Dundee.

In 2021, Aboriginal Australian rapper Barkaa (Malyangapa and Barkindji) released the single "King Brown", beginning with the line "My ex called me toxic, call me King Brown". The single was nominated for "Song of the Year" and won "Film Clip of the Year" at the National Indigenous Music Awards 2022, and was voted in at #177 in the Triple J Hottest 100, 2021.

In a 2002 memoir, British businessman and property developer Alistair McAlpine (1942–2014) recalled an occasion when an employee of his at his Pearl Coast Zoological Gardens in Broome, Western Australia got bitten by the snake: "...and a very angry snake lost no time in passing through the hole and biting the man on the ankle on the way out. In moments, his leg turned black. Luckily there was help nearby and the hospital was only five minutes away by car. He was, however, two weeks in that hospital, suffering considerable pain in both his legs and his head. Without the hospital and expert attention, the welder would not have survived."
