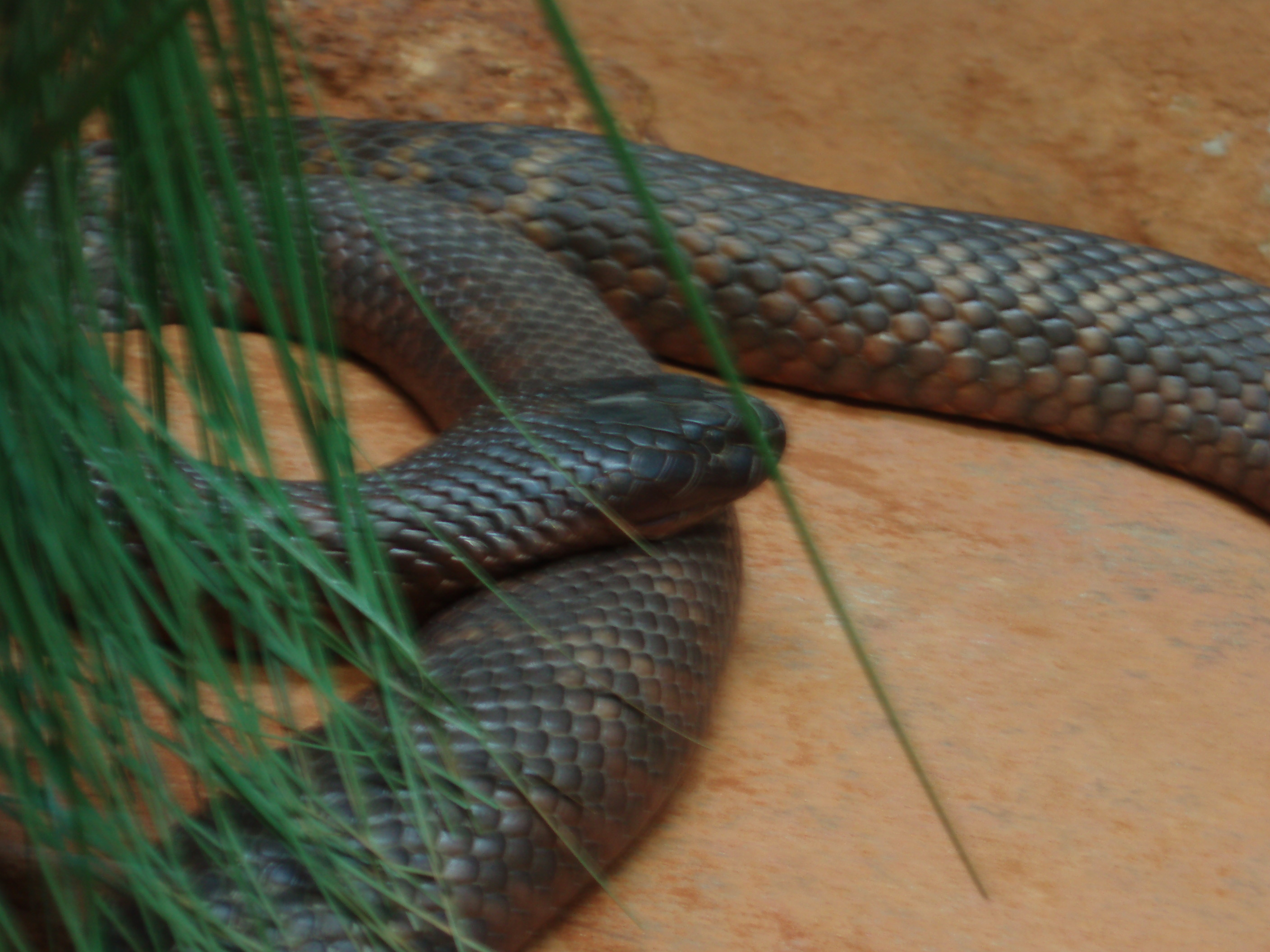

Scientific classification
- Kingdom: Animalia
- Phylum: Chordata
- Class: Reptilia
- Order: Squamata
- Suborder: Serpentes
- Family: Elapidae
- Genus: Pseudechis
- Species: P. colletti

Binomial name
- Pseudechis colletti Boulenger, 1902

= Collett's snake =

Highly venomous snake native to northeastern Australia

Collett's snake (Pseudechis colletti), also commonly known as Collett's black snake, Collett's cobra, or Down's tiger snake, is a species of venomous snake in the family Elapidae. The species is native to Australia. Collett's snake is capable of delivering a fatal bite and is considered the nineteenth most venomous snake in the world.

== Taxonomy and etymology ==
Collett's snake is one of several species in the genus Pseudechis commonly known as black snakes. A study of mitochondrial DNA showed it to be most closely related to the blue-bellied black snake (P. guttatus), with the Papuan black snake (P. papuanus) as the next closest relative to the pair.

Belgian-born British zoologist George Albert Boulenger described the species P. colletti in 1902, naming it in honour of Norwegian zoologist Robert Collett. A young snake had been collected by Collett, and Boulenger had noted its scale pattern to be distinct from the Papuan black snake.

== Description ==
The most colourful member of the black snake genus Pseudechis, Collett's snake has dark brown to black upperparts, with pink or cream banding and sides, and pale yellow to orange underparts. The irregular bands are usually cross-shaped and are generally an orange-red colour. The underbelly is normally the same colour as the bands, but may have varied discolourations or discoloured patches. Juveniles are usually the same colour as adults but generally have brighter shades and contrast more. It is similar in physical structure (but not appearance) to the red-bellied black snake.

Collett's snake is usually between 1.8–2.2 m (5.9–7.2 ft) in total length (including tail). Males can reach up to 2.6 m (8.5 ft) in total length, while females can reach up to 2.1 m (6.9 ft). At birth, it is usually 30 cm (0.98 ft) in total length.

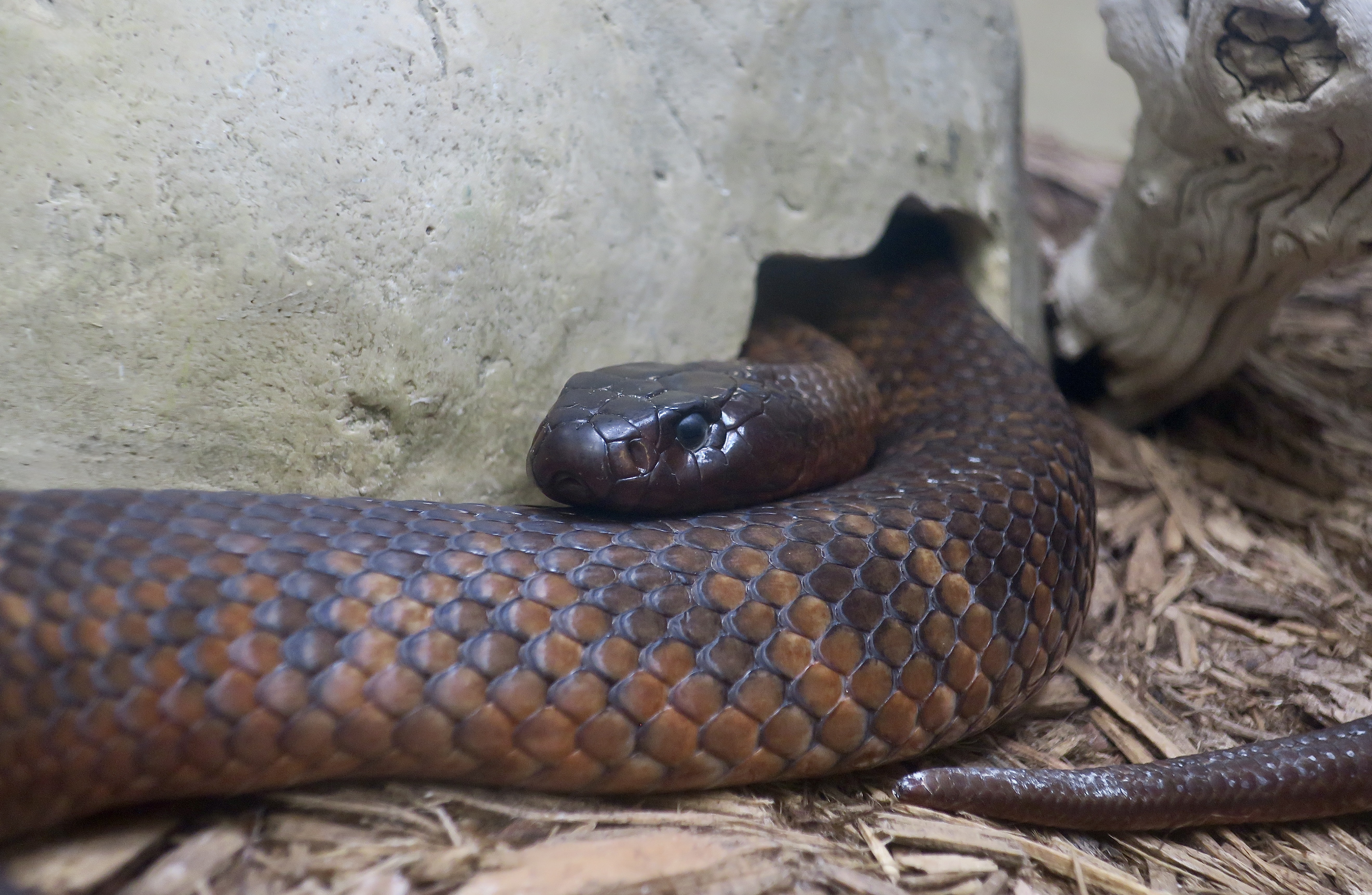
A Collett's snake at Phoenix Herpetological Sanctuary.

== Venom ==
Previously thought to be only moderately venomous to people, Collett's snake is now known to have been responsible for severe envenomation, with cases proceeding to rhabdomyolysis and acute kidney injury. Toxicity and symptoms of the venom resemble that of the mulga snake (P. australis). Early symptoms include nausea, vomiting, abdominal pain, diarrhea and headache, an anticoagulant coagulopathy, with risk of rhabdomyolysis and acute kidney injury within 24 hours if fluid replacement and black snake antivenom are not given. Despite the danger, its attractive markings have led it to being a popular snake in captivity.

The venom produced by Collett's snake is similar to the Papuan black snake's and mulga snake's venom. The venom is cytotoxic and has haemolytic activity. Neurotoxins may also be found in its venom as well. P. colletti produces about 30 milligrams of venom in one strike. Black snake or tiger snake anti-venom can be administered. It is the world's nineteenth most venomous snake.

== Distribution and habitat ==
Collett's snake is found in central western Queensland, and is diurnal. It is primarily found to the west of Queensland and spreading from the north to south. It is found in dry-barren areas or plains.

== Behaviour ==
=== Diet ===
The main diet of Collett's snake consists of amphibians, reptiles, and small mammals. They threaten many local geckos such as the dubious dtella. Cannibalism is also known to occur in Collett's snake.

=== Reproduction ===
Mating of P. colletti occurs from early August to late October. Collett's snake is oviparous and may lay up to 20 eggs in a clutch. Reproduction in captivity is known to be highly successful.
