= Armadale Reptile Centre =

Zoo in Western Australia

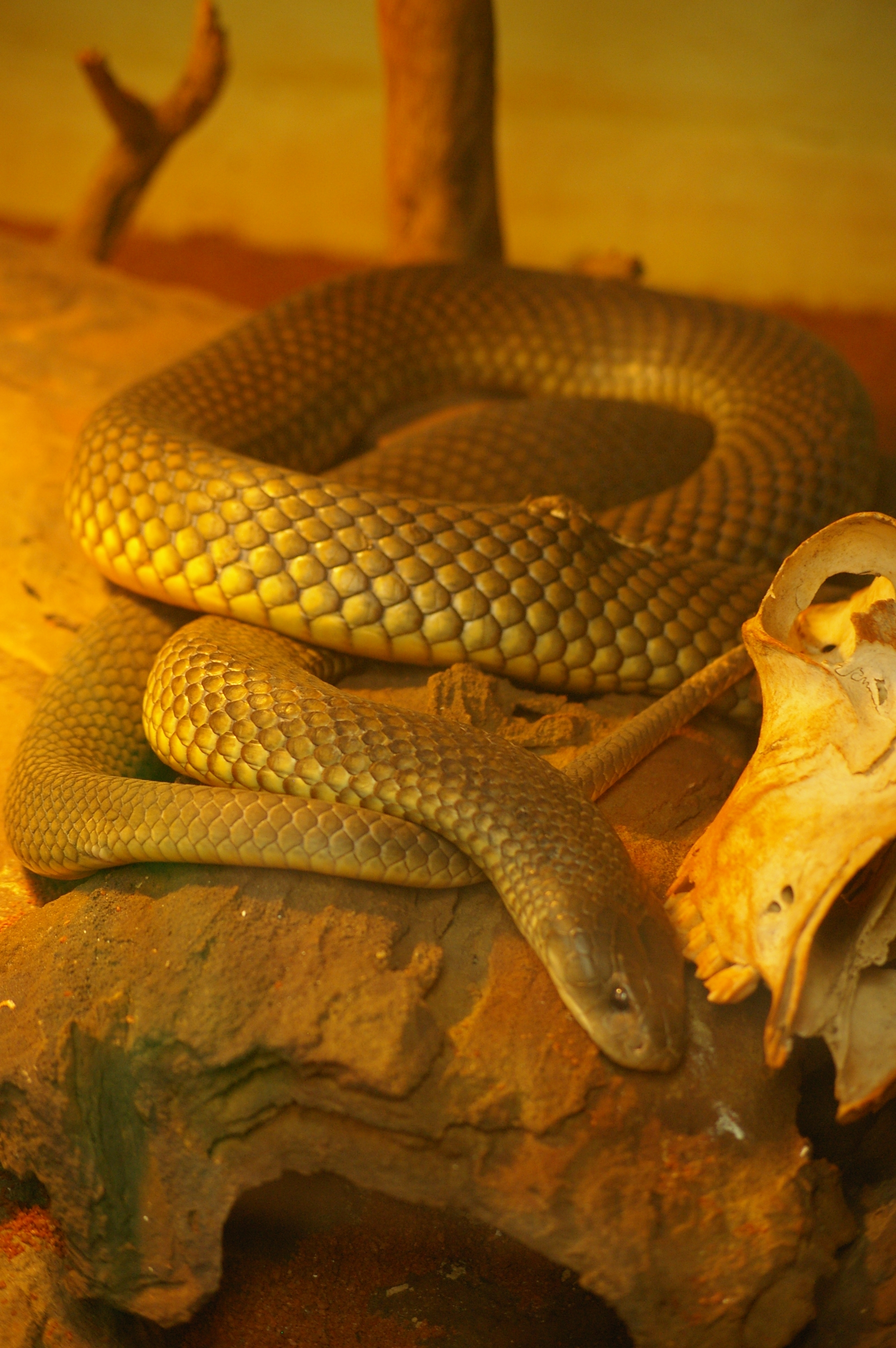
- King brown snake at the centre
- Interactive map of Armadale Reptile Centre
- 32.1766°S 116.0147°E
- Date opened: 1995
- Location: Armadale, Western Australia
- No. of animals: Numbers vary as centre cares for injured and orphaned animals continuously
- No. of species: 120+ (including over 50 species of reptile)
- Website: www.armadalereptilecentre.com.au

The Armadale Reptile Centre is a reptile zoo (featuring a number of other animals) in Armadale, Western Australia that focuses on herpetology and wildlife endemic to Australia (with a few exotic reptile species as exception).

Opened to the public in 1995, the Armadale Reptile Centre houses a large variety of mostly native reptiles and other wildlife with over 50 different reptile species on display, including a large female saltwater crocodile and various species of lizards, snakes and turtles, as well as other animals such as tree frogs, cockatoos, dingoes, emus, marsupials (including kangaroos), owls and wedge-tailed eagles. The centre is also used as a rescue and rehabilitation facility for wildlife that are sick or injured. Klaas and Mieke Gaikhorst built and own the centre, having worked with rescuing and rehabilitating injured or displaced reptiles (and other animals) for more than thirty years.

== Species at the centre ==
Reptiles

- Bardick
- Black-headed python
- Black-tailed monitor
- Boa constrictor
- Bobtail lizard
- Boyd's forest dragon
- Broad leaf-tailed gecko
- Brown tree snake
- Burton's legless lizard
- Central bearded dragon
- Centralian carpet python
- Centralian blue-tongued lizard
- Children's python
- Common death adder
- Common scaly-foot
- Crowned snake
- Darwin carpet python
- Dugite
- Eastern snake-necked turtle
- Eastern water dragon
- Fraser's legless lizard
- Frill-necked lizard
- Gilbert's lashtail dragon
- Gwardar
- Jungle carpet python
- King brown snake
- King's skink
- Lace monitor
- Long-nosed lashtail dragon
- Murray short-necked turtle
- Northern giant cave gecko
- Northern blue-tongued lizard
- Oblong turtle
- Olive python
- Ornate crevice dragon
- Perentie
- Pygmy python
- Pygmy spiny-tailed skink
- Red-bellied black snake
- Red-eared slider
- Rosenberg's monitor
- Rough knob-tailed gecko
- Rough-scaled python
- Saltwater crocodile
- Sand goanna
- Saw-shelled turtle
- Southwest carpet python
- Spiny-tailed ridge monitor
- Spotted mulga snake
- Spotted python
- Stimson's python
- Thick-tailed barking gecko
- Water python
- Western bearded dragon
- Western tiger snake
- Western blue-tongued lizard
- Woma python

Amphibians

- Australian green tree frog
- Splendid tree frog
- White-lipped tree frog

Others

(Birds)

- African firefinch
- Alexandrine parakeet
- Australian barn owl
- Australian boobook owl
- Australian bustard
- Australian magpie
- Baudin's black-cockatoo
- Black-faced woodswallow
- Black-throated finch
- Bourke's parrot
- Bush stone-curlew
- Cockatiel
- Common bronzewing
- Common pheasant
- Diamond firetail
- Domestic chicken
- Double-barred finch
- Dusky woodswallow
- Eclectus parrot
- Emu
- Galah
- Gouldian finch
- Grey butcherbird
- King quail
- Laughing dove
- Laughing kookaburra
- Little corella
- Long-billed corella
- Long-tailed finch
- Peewit lark
- Major Mitchell's cockatoo
- Nankeen kestrel
- Orange-breasted waxbill
- Painted finch
- Peaceful dove
- Pied butcherbird
- Princess parrot
- Red-backed kingfisher
- Red-headed parrotfinch
- Red-tailed black-cockatoo
- Sacred kingfisher
- Scarlet-chested parrot
- Star finch
- Stubble quail
- Sulphur-crested cockatoo
- Tawny frogmouth
- Wedge-tailed eagle
- Western corella

(Fish)

- Frontosa cichlid
- Perlmutt
- Red fin borleyi

(Mammals)

- Bare-nosed wombat
- Dingo
- Domestic donkey
- Domestic pony
- Grey-headed flying fox
- Red kangaroo
- Short-beaked echidna
- Southwestern brushtail possum
- Western grey kangaroo
- Western wallaroo
