= P. australis =

P. australis may refer to:

- Pachyornis australis, the crested moa, an extinct bird species
- Paracalliope australis, an amphipod crustacean species in the genus Paracalliope found in Australasia
- Petaurus australis, a marsupial native to eastern Australia
- Phaius australis, an orchid species
- Phasianella australis, the Australian pheasant, painted lady and pheasant snail, a medium-sized to large species of sea snail species found in Australia
- Phragmites australis, the common reed, a large perennial grass species found in wetlands throughout temperate and tropical regions of the world
- Planchonella australis (syn. Pouteria australis), the black apple, a tree species native to Australia
- Polylepis australis, the tabaquillo or queñoa, a tree species endemic of central Argentina
- Posidonia australis, the fibreball weed, a seagrass species found in the southern waters of Australia
- Pseudechis australis, the common king brown or Mulga snake, a highly dangerous snake species found in Australia
- Pseudomys australis, the plains rat, a threatened rodent species native to Australia
- Pseudophryne australis, the red-crowned toadlet, a ground frog species restricted to the Sydney Basin, New South Wales, Australia

== See also ==
- Australis (disambiguation)
