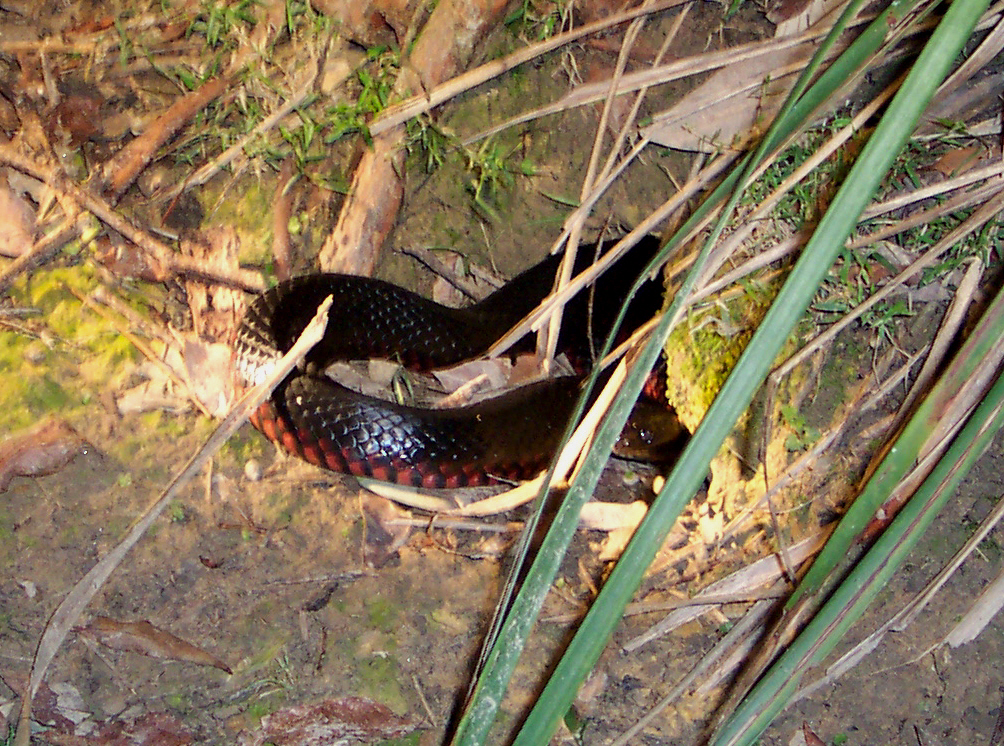
- type species Pseudechis porphyriacus, the red-bellied black snake

Scientific classification
- Kingdom: Animalia
- Phylum: Chordata
- Class: Reptilia
- Order: Squamata
- Suborder: Serpentes
- Family: Elapidae
- Subfamily: Hydrophiinae
- Genus: Pseudechis; Wagler, 1830

Type species
- Coluber porphyriacus Shaw, 1794

Species
- At least nine, see text

= Pseudechis =

Genus of snakes

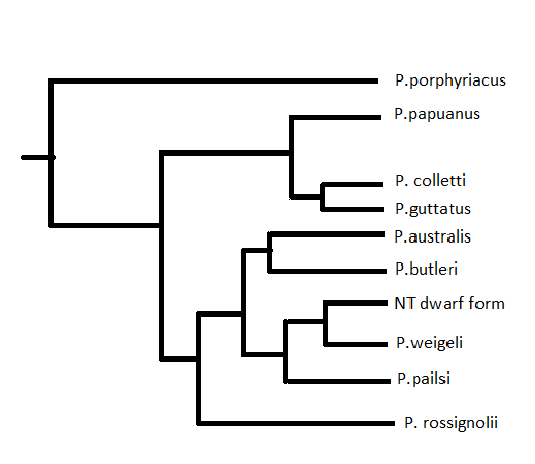
Phylogenetic tree of species within Pseudechis. The NT dwarf form is an undescribed species. After Maddock et al. 2017.

Pseudechis is a genus of venomous snakes in the family Elapidae. It contains the group of elapid species commonly referred to as the black snakes. Species of Pseudechis are found in every Australian state with the exception of Tasmania, and some species are found in Papua New Guinea. They inhabit a variety of habitat types, from arid areas to swampland. All species are dangerous (Pseudechis signifying "like a viper", Greek echis) and can inflict a potentially lethal bite. Most snakes in this genus reach about 2 m (6.6 ft) in total length (including tail), and vary in colour. Some species are brown, whereas others are black. The most recognisable and widespread species in the genus are the red-bellied black snake (P. porphyriacus) and the king brown snake (P. australis). These snakes feed on lizards, frogs, birds, small mammals, and even other snakes. All species of Pseudechis lay eggs with the exception of the red-bellied black snake P. porphyriacus which is viviparous. The genus Pailsus is a synonym of Pseudechis, and more work is needed to understand species limits among the smaller species of the group.

== Taxonomy ==
The genus was established in 1860 by Johann Wagler, separating a species previously described by George Shaw in the new combination Pseudechis porphyriacus as a monotypic genus. The systematic revision of the elapid family by George Albert Boulenger in 1896 allied the descriptions of eight species, and by 1933 the number totalled taxa assigned to the genus. A revision of Pseudechis by Roy D. Mackay in 1955 placed many of these descriptions in synonymy, reducing the number of recognised species to five. The examination of a large series of specimens of the king brown Pseudechis australis was undertaken by Laurie Smith, recognising clinal variability within the population and separating a form with significant distinctions in morphology as a sixth species of the genus, Pseudechis butleri.

The taxonomy of snakes of the genus Pseudechis is unsettled, with at least one species undescribed; several recent phylogenetic studies have provided evidence of the presence of species beyond the six recognised in most books.

Image	Scientific name	Common name	Distribution
	Pseudechis australis (Gray, 1842)	king brown snake, mulga snake	northern, western, and Central Australia
	Pseudechis butleri L.A. Smith, 1982	Butler's black snake, Butler's snake, spotted mulga snake	Western Australia
	Pseudechis colletti Boulenger, 1902	Collett's black snake, Collett's cobra, Collett's snake, Down's tiger snake	Australia
	Pseudechis guttatus De Vis, 1905	blue-bellied black snake, spotted black snake	south-eastern Queensland and northern New South Wales.
	Pseudechis pailsei (Hoser, 1998)	eastern dwarf mulga snake, eastern pygmy mulga snake, false king brown snake	Australia
	Pseudechis papuanus W. Peters & Doria, 1878	Papuan black snake	New Guinea
	Pseudechis porphyriacus (Shaw, 1794)	Australian black snake, common black snake, red-bellied black snake, redbelly	Australia
	Pseudechis rossignolii (Hoser, 2000)	Papuan pygmy mulga snake	New Guinea
	Pseudechis weigeli (Wells & Wellington, 1987)	pygmy king brown snake, pygmy mulga snake	Australia

Nota bene: A binomial authority in parentheses indicates that the species was originally described in a genus other than Pseudechis.
