= YHI =

YHI may refer to:

- YHI, the IATA code for Ulukhaktok/Holman Airport in the Northwest Territories, Canada.
- Yhi, a goddess of light and creation in Australian Aboriginal mythology
- YHI International Limited, a Singapore-based multinational engineering company
- Yhi (crustacean), a genus of amphipod crustacean
