= Paracalliope fluviatilis =

Scientific classification
- Domain: Eukaryota
- Kingdom: Animalia
- Phylum: Arthropoda
- Class: Malacostraca
- Order: Amphipoda
- Family: Paracalliopiidae
- Genus: Paracalliope
- Species: P. fluviatilis

Binomial name
- Paracalliope fluviatilis (Thomson, 1879)

Species of crustacean

Paracalliope fluviatilis is a species of amphipod in the family Paracalliopiidae.
