= Paracalliope karitane =

Scientific classification
- Domain: Eukaryota
- Kingdom: Animalia
- Phylum: Arthropoda
- Class: Malacostraca
- Order: Amphipoda
- Family: Paracalliopiidae
- Genus: Paracalliope
- Species: P. karitane

Binomial name
- Paracalliope karitane J.L.Barnard, 1972

Species of crustacean

Paracalliope karitane is a species of amphipod in the family Paracalliopiidae.
