= Papuan black snake =

Papuan Black Snake

Scientific classification
- Kingdom: Animalia
- Phylum: Chordata
- Class: Reptilia
- Order: Squamata
- Suborder: Serpentes
- Family: Elapidae
- Genus: Pseudechis
- Species: P. papuanus

Binomial name
- Pseudechis papuanus Peters & Doria, 1878

Highly venomous snake native to New Guinea

The Papuan black snake (Pseudechis papuanus) is a highly venomous snake of the family Elapidae native to New Guinea. Reaching around 2 m (6 ft 7 in) in length, it is a predominantly black snake coloured grey underneath.

== Taxonomy ==
The Papuan black snake is one of several species in the genus Pseudechis commonly known as black snakes. It was described in 1878 by Wilhelm Peters and Giacomo Doria in 1878 from material collected in southeastern New Guinea.

A study of mitochondrial DNA showed the Papuan black snake to be the next closest relative to a pair of Australian species, Collett's Snake (P. collettii) and the blue-bellied black snake (P. guttatus), and is likely to have had its origins in Australia and diverged from a common ancestor in the Pliocene.

== Description ==
A solidly built snake with a wide round head and slight neck, the Papuan black snake ranges from 1.2 to 1.7 m in length, with individuals occasionally exceeding 2 metres. The longest specimen recorded was 2.44 m. The head and upperparts are dull or glossy black, or occasionally dark brown, and underparts are blue-grey or gunmetal grey. The neck is whitish with yellow and grey tinges. The labial scales are sometimes pale around the mouth and front of head.

=== Scalation ===
The number and arrangement of scales on a snake's body are key elements of identification to species level. The Papuan black snake has 19 to 21 rows of dorsal scales at midbody, 205 to 239 ventral scales, 43 to 63 subcaudal scales, and a divided anal scale.

== Distribution and habitat ==
The range is southern New Guinea, both in Papua New Guinea and West Papua province of Indonesia, as well as offshore islands. In Papua New Guinea, it has possibly already vanished from Port Moresby and Central Province and is declining in Western Province. It just enters Australian territory as it occurs on Boigu and Saibai Islands in far northern Torres Strait off the New Guinea coast.

Destruction of its habitat, killing of snakes by locals, and poisoning by the introduced cane toad have contributed to its decline.

== Venom ==
The venom of the Papuan black snake is the most potent of all members of the black snake genus Pseudechis. Unlike those of other black snakes, the venom is predominantly neurotoxic in its effects, with muscle weakness and paralysis ensuing within 2 to 21 hours of being bitten. This can be life-threatening and intubation may be required. It is slightly more toxic than the equatorial spitting cobra (Naja sumatrana) and three times less toxic than that of the Coastal taipan (Oxyuranus scutellatus). A postsynaptic neurotoxin isolated has been given the name of papuantoxin-1, and can be treated with CSL black snake antivenom (used for the Mulga snake (Pseudechis australis)).

Although widely feared in Papua New Guinea's Central Province, it is responsible for only a small minority of snakebites, eclipsed by the more dangerous taipan. Identifying snakes after snakebite can be difficult as victims are often bitten while walking through long kunai grass and hence the snake is not seen clearly. The Mekeo people know it as auguma, "to bite again", from its habit of repeatedly biting. Some local people in New Guinea believe it and the taipan to be opposite sexes of the same species. The Kiwai people believe the snake to be an agent of a magic-man known as Ove-devenor who sends it to kill enemies. People bitten will often seek out another magic-man instead of going to a hospital, thus dangerously delaying treatment.

The first to extract Papuan black snake venom for scientific purposes was Australian herpetologist Ken Slater in the mid-1950s. He sent it to the Commonwealth Serum Laboratories in Melbourne for antivenom research. The resulting antivenom is also effective against the related Mulga snake. It was first given to a young male bite victim in New Guinea in 1959, who became the first documented survivor of a Papuan black snake attack. Slater was the only person milking snakes for the PNG Department of Agriculture. After he resigned in 1959, the department announced they would pay £3/foot for each Papuan black snake caught. Dismayed, Slater feared that unskilled people would be emboldened to try to catch them.
