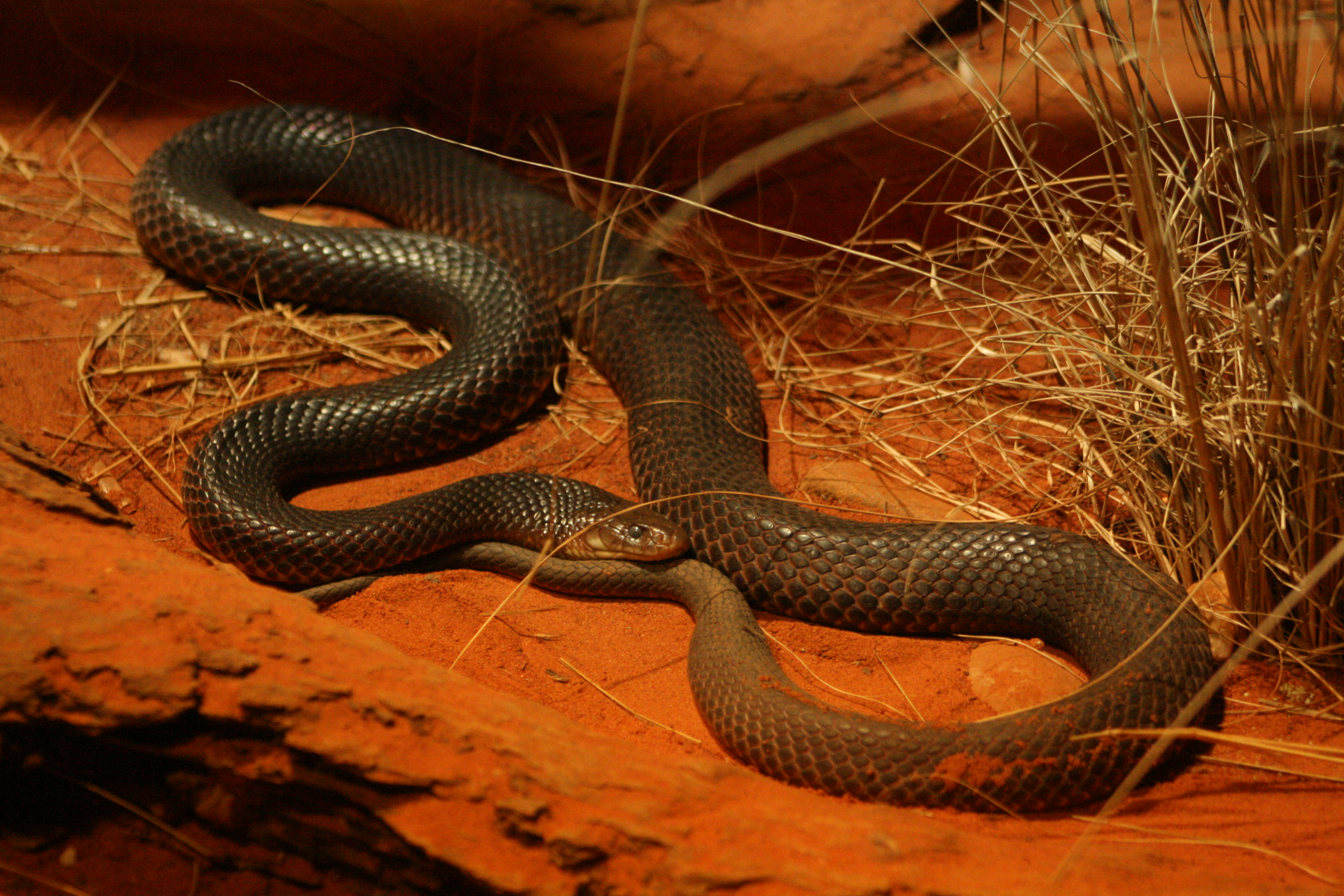

Scientific classification
- Kingdom: Animalia
- Phylum: Chordata
- Class: Reptilia
- Order: Squamata
- Suborder: Serpentes
- Family: Elapidae
- Genus: Pseudechis
- Species: P. rossignolii

Binomial name
- Pseudechis rossignolii (Hoser, 2000)

= Papuan pygmy mulga snake =

Highly venomous snake native to New Guinea

The Papuan pygmy mulga snake (Pseudechis rossignolii) is a venomous snake of the family Elapidae native to New Guinea, genetically confirmed as a distinct species in 2017. It was originally described by Raymond Hoser in 2000 as Pailsus rossignolii, naming it for Victorian snake handler Fred Rossignoli.
