= Pygmy mulga snake =

Conservation status
- Least Concern (IUCN 3.1)

Scientific classification
- Kingdom: Animalia
- Phylum: Chordata
- Class: Reptilia
- Order: Squamata
- Suborder: Serpentes
- Family: Elapidae
- Genus: Pseudechis
- Species: P. weigeli

Binomial name
- Pseudechis weigeli (Wells & Wellington, 1987)

Synonyms
- Cannia weigeli Wells & Wellington, 1987; Pseudechis weigeli — Wüster et al., 2004

Species of snake

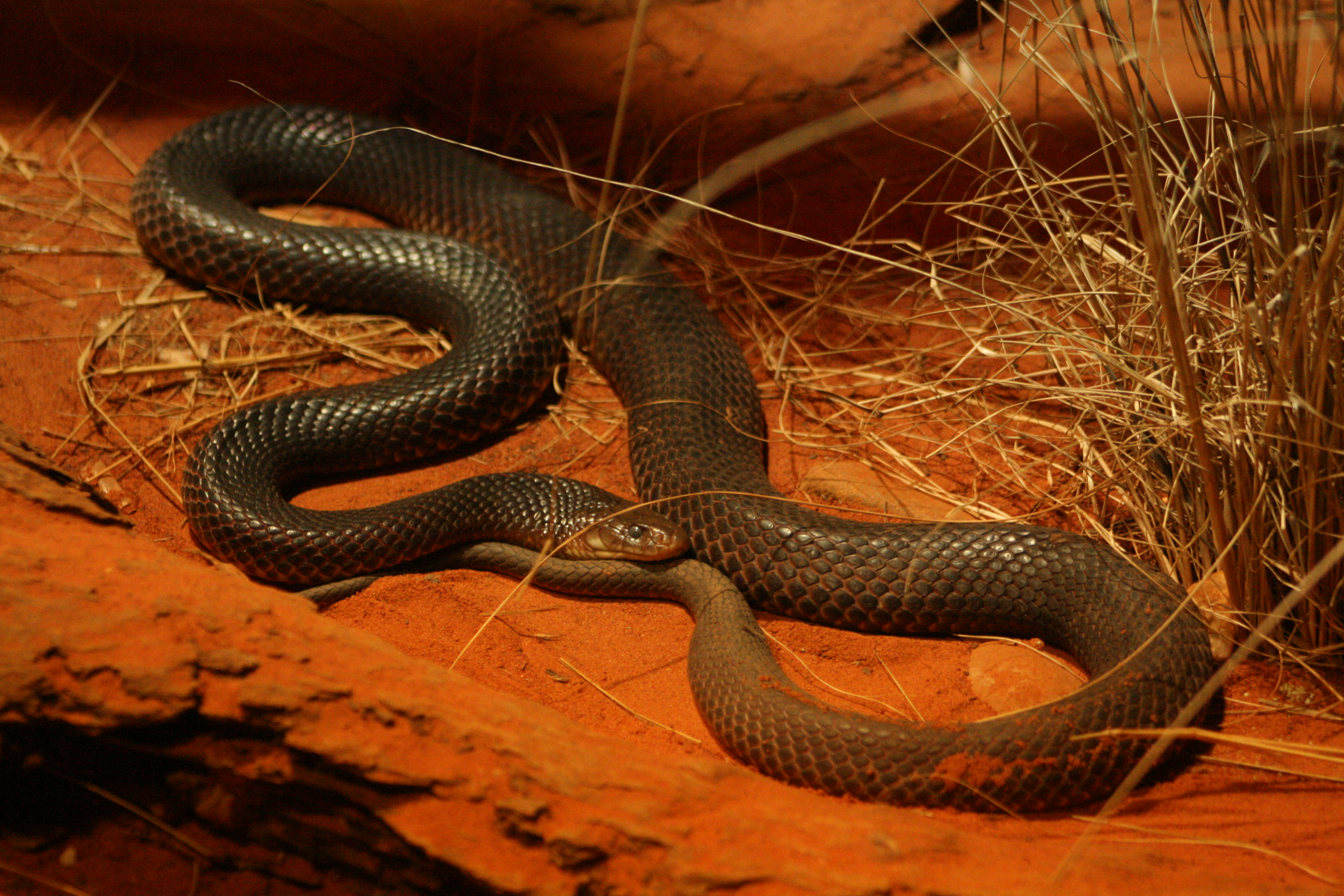
Pygmy king brown snake

The pygmy mulga snake (Pseudechis weigeli), also commonly known as the pygmy king brown snake, is a species of venomous snake in the black snake genus Pseudechis in the family Elapidae. The species is native to Australia.

== Geographic range ==
In Australia, P. weigeli is endemic to the Kimberley ranges.

== Habitat ==
The preferred natural habitats of P. weigeli are forest and savanna.

== Reproduction ==
P. weigeli is ovoviviparous.

== Taxonomy ==
P. weigeli was genetically confirmed as a distinct species in 2017. Within the genus Pseudechis it is most closely related to the eastern dwarf mulga snake (P. pailsei) and an as yet undescribed species from the Northern Territory.

== Etymology ==
The specific name, weigeli, is in honor of Australian herpetologist John Randall Weigel (born 1955).
