= Hedruris spinigera =

Scientific classification
- Domain: Eukaryota
- Kingdom: Animalia
- Phylum: Nematoda
- Class: Chromadorea
- Order: Rhabditida
- Family: Hedruridae
- Genus: Hedruris
- Species: H. spinigera

Binomial name
- Hedruris spinigera Baylis, 1931

Species of roundworm

Hedruris spinigera is a parasite belong to phylum Nematoda, commonly found in the stomach of freshwater fish. The female Hedruris spinigera attaches itself onto the epithelium of the fishes' stomach using a hook at the curved tail. Meanwhile, the male swims freely until it finds a female that has already attached to a host, then the male curls around the body of that female so that sexual reproduction occurs within the host. Most fishes consume Paracorophium excavatum, the intermediate host for Hedruris spinigera; however, the prevalences of Hedruris spinigera are restricted to certain host range.

== Morphology ==
Hedruris spinigera have four complex lips consisting of two lateral pseudolabia and two median lips. The oesophagus is not clearly divided into muscular and glandular portions. The body of Hedruris spinigera is covered by non-living cuticles. The female Hedruris spinigera has a prehensile hook at the posterior end. Immature adults within the intermediate host are similar to mature adults, except for the smaller size and absence of eggs.

== Geographic distribution ==
Hedruris spinigera are widely distributed within New Zealand. scientists found that the distribution appears to be limited within the coastal area, especially in brackish waters. The prevalence of Hedruris spinigera depends on species of fishes. The prevalence in intermediate hosts was found infected with one worm, but sometimes two or three worms could also be found in intermediate hosts.

== Life cycle ==
The intermediate host for Hedruris spinigera is the amphipod crustacean Paracorophium excavatum. Hedruris spinigera has limited host range because some fishes failed to establish Hedruris spinigera due to lack of the proper attachment site on epithelium of fish stomach. Although most fishes consume Paracorophium excavatum, Hedruris spinigera actually distribute in only a limited host range. Scientists have found that Aldrichetta forsteri and Retropinna retropinna fish species are the truly suitable hosts for Hedruris spinigera. The infection site in the adult worm occurs at the stomach where the female attaches to, but parasite could also be free-living as found in rectum and intestine of fishes. As for immature Hedruris spinigera, the site of infection occurs at hemocoelomic cavity, where the worms are coiled but not encysted.
