= Paracalliope =

Scientific classification
- Kingdom: Animalia
- Phylum: Arthropoda
- Class: Malacostraca
- Order: Amphipoda
- Family: Paracalliopiidae
- Genus: Paracalliope; Stebbing, 1899

Type species
- Calliope fluviatilis Thomson, 1879

Genus of crustaceans

Paracalliope is a genus of amphipod crustaceans that live in Australasia. They include the most common freshwater amphipods in New Zealand, where they are particularly frequent in slow-flowing reaches of rivers. They shelter among weed beds and are important prey items for fish such as the New Zealand smelt, Retropinna retropinna, which are in turn important prey for the freshwater eels Anguilla australis and Anguilla dieffenbachii. Paracalliope acts as an intermediate host for the nematode Hedruris spinigera, which can thus reach their primary host, the eel.

== Species ==
Ten species have been described:

- Paracalliope australis (Haswell, 1880) – Australia
- Paracalliope bacescui Ortiz & Lalana, 1997 – Indonesia
- Paracalliope dichotomus Morino, 1991 – Japan
- Paracalliope fluviatilis (Thomson, 1879) – New Zealand
- Paracalliope karitane Barnard, 1972 – New Zealand
- Paracalliope larai Knott, 1975 – Australia
- Paracalliope lowryi Barnard & Drummond, 1992 – Australia
- Paracalliope mapela Myers, 1985 – Fiji
- Paracalliope novaecaledoniae Ruffo & Paiotta, 1972 – New Caledonia
- Paracalliope vicinus Barnard & Drummond, 1992 – Australia
