= Pilbara death adder =

Conservation status
- Least Concern (IUCN 3.1)

Scientific classification
- Kingdom: Animalia
- Phylum: Chordata
- Class: Reptilia
- Order: Squamata
- Suborder: Serpentes
- Family: Elapidae
- Genus: Acanthophis
- Species: A. wellsi

Binomial name
- Acanthophis wellsi Hoser, 1998

Synonyms
- Acanthophis wellsei [sic] Hoser, 1998; Acanthophis wellsi — Aplin & Donnellan, 1999 (emendation)

Species of snake

The Pilbara death adder (Acanthophis wellsi), also known commonly as Wells' death adder, is a species of venomous snake in the family Elapidae. The species is one of the eight members of the genus Acanthophis, a genus which is found throughout northwestern and southwestern Australia and some parts of southern Papua New Guinea. The species Acanthophis wellsi is endemic to Western Australia.

== Taxonomy ==
The Pilbara death adder was described by Raymond Hoser in 1998. The specific name, wellsi, is in honor of Australian herpetologist Richard Walter Wells.

== Description ==
Dorsally, A. wellsi is usually brick red, with narrow, close-spaced gray crossbands. Individuals called "melanistic" have a black head, and the crossbands, which are wider, are yellowish brown, edged with black.

== Distribution and habitat ==
Acanthophis wellsi is found in the Hamersley Range and the Chichester Range in the Pilbara region in northern Western Australia.

== Habitat ==
The preferred natural habitats of A. wellsi are grassland, shrubland, and rocky areas.

== Reproduction ==
Acanthophis wellsi is ovoviviparous.
