= Spotted mulga snake =

Conservation status
- Least Concern (IUCN 3.1)

Scientific classification
- Kingdom: Animalia
- Phylum: Chordata
- Class: Reptilia
- Order: Squamata
- Suborder: Serpentes
- Family: Elapidae
- Genus: Pseudechis
- Species: P. butleri

Binomial name
- Pseudechis butleri L.A. Smith, 1982

Highly venomous snake native to Western Australia

The spotted mulga snake (Pseudechis butleri), also known commonly as Butler's black snake and Butler's snake, is a species of venomous snake in the family Elapidae. The species is endemic to Western Australia. It is a member of the genus Pseudechis, dangerously venomous snakes that can intimidate an opponent by raising the head and presenting a hood. This cobra-like threat display is supported by the ability to produce a very large amount of venom.

== Taxonomy ==
The first description of the species P. butleri emerged in a study of morphological variation of the widespread species P. australis, known commonly as the king brown or mulga snake. The author, Laurie Smith, examined a large series of specimens, allocating 213 to P. australis and 21 to the new species. The holotype of P. butleri is a female specimen, carrying eggs, collected at the Yalgoo region in 1963 by I. C. Carnaby. The suggestion of a cryptic Pseudechis species in the midwest was noticed by Ludwig Glauert in 1957, but with few available specimens the author hesitated to describe it as a new taxon. The morphological comparison by Smith concluded the closest affinity was with the type of the genus, P. porphyriacus, the red-bellied Pseudechis of Australia's eastern states. A revision of the phylogeny of the "black snake" genus several years later found instead that this species was most closely related to P. australis in finer details of morphology, a position supported by comparison of results from electrophoretic analysis of blood proteins and phylogenetic indicators.

Common names for P. butleri include Butler's black snake, Butler's snake, and spotted mulga snake. The generic name, Pseudechis, suggests a similarity to the African-Asian vipers of the genus Echis. The specific epithet, butleri, commemorates the conservation efforts of naturalist W. H. "Harry" Butler.

== Description ==
P. butleri is a species of Pseudechis, a genus of large front-fanged venomous snakes occurring in Australia and New Guinea. The species is similar to the common mulga P. australis, a larger and widespread snake which occurs in sympatry at parts of central Western Australia. However, P. butleri is spotted with yellow or yellow-green scales and does not usually exceed a total length (including tail) of 1.6 m (5.2 ft). The snout-to-vent length (SVL) is up to 1.56 m (5.1 ft), and the tail length is around 15% of the SVL. The dorsal scales of the body are occasionally all black, but most of the upper body is covered in yellow or brownish scales with black bases. The colour of the head and neck tends to completely black. The neck is slightly defined from the head, broad and slightly larger than the robust body.

Pseudechis butleri is readily distinguished from others of the genus, by colouration and by the number of ventral scales. The number of dorsal scale rows at the midbody is 17, at the neck this is usually 19, but ranges from 16 to 23. Just anterior to the tail there are 17 (15–18) rows. P. australis has reddish-brown ventral scales, each with a cream-coloured edge, whereas P. butleri has black-based, bright yellow ventral scales. Also, the number of ventral scales in P. butleri is less than in specimens of P. australis found at the same latitude. P. butleri has a range of 189–207, compared to the range 204–216 for P. australis. The color of the ventral scales is pink or red in the black snake of Eastern Australia, P. porphyriacus, which has even fewer ventral scales than P. butleri. The lighter spots of P. butleri were described by Glauert, when examining a recently killed specimen, as "primrose yellow".

== Distribution and habitat ==
The distribution range of P. butleri is within the Murchison region of Western Australia, where it occurs in Acacia woodlands on stony and loamy soils, and occasionally amongst rocks. Specimens of this West Australian endemic species have been recorded in Mullewa in the north, as far south as Leonora, and to the east near Laverton.

== Venom ==
The venom of P. butleri contains systemic myotoxins. Treatment for positive envenomation is the same as for P. australis, using a black snake antivenom.

== Reproduction ==
P. butleri is oviparous. Mating takes place in October and November. A clutch of 7–12 eggs is laid in December. Hatchlings emerge after 65–80 days.
