= Hedruris =

Scientific classification
- Kingdom: Animalia
- Phylum: Nematoda
- Class: Chromadorea
- Order: Rhabditida
- Family: Hedruridae
- Genus: Hedruris; Nitzsch, 1821

Genus of roundworms

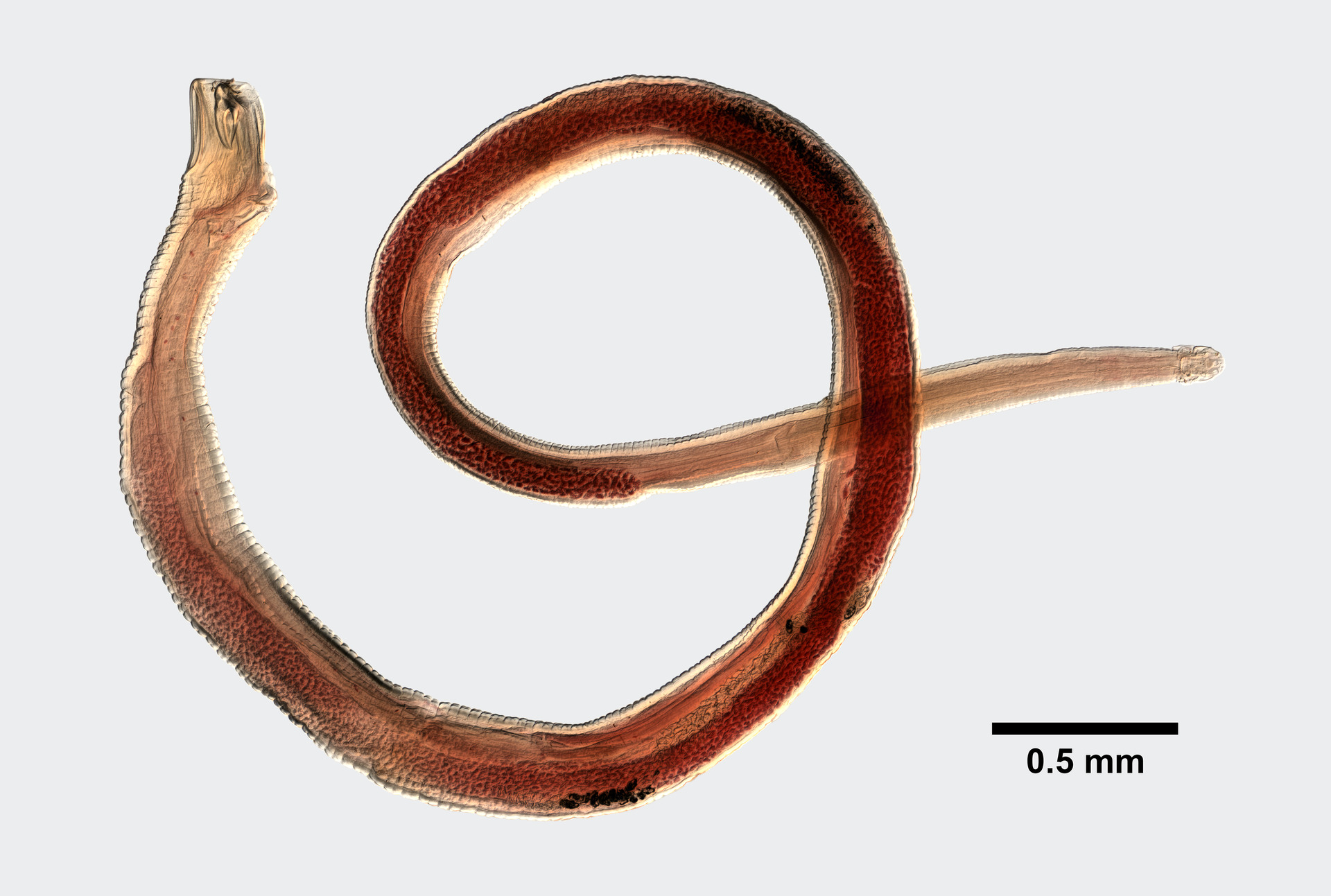
Hedruris chandleri

Hedruris is a genus of nematodes belonging to the family Hedruridae.

The genus has almost cosmopolitan distribution.

Species:

- Hedruris androphora Nitzsch, 1821
- Hedruris juninensis Bendezu, 1976
- Hedruris miyakoensis Hasegawa, 1989
- Hedruris moneiezi Ibanez
- Hedruris mucronifer Stekhoven, 1952
- Hedruris scabra Freitas & Lent, 1941
- Hedruris spinigera Baylis, 1931
- Hedruris suttonae Brugni & Viozzi, 2010
