= Yhi yindi =

Scientific classification
- Domain: Eukaryota
- Kingdom: Animalia
- Phylum: Arthropoda
- Class: Malacostraca
- Order: Amphipoda
- Family: Paracalliopiidae
- Genus: Yhi; Barnard & Thomas, 1991
- Species: Y. yindi

Binomial name
- Yhi yindi Barnard & Thomas, 1991

Species of crustacean

Yhi yindi is a species of amphipod crustacean, known only from Orpheus Island, Queensland, Australia. It was described in 1991 by J. Laurens Barnard and J. D. Thomas, and remains the only species in the genus Yhi.
