= Hedruridae =

Scientific classification
- Domain: Eukaryota
- Kingdom: Animalia
- Phylum: Nematoda
- Class: Chromadorea
- Order: Rhabditida
- Family: Hedruridae

Family of spirurian roundworms

Hedruridae is a family of nematodes belonging to the order Rhabditida.

Genera:

- Hedruris Nitzsch, 1821
