= Eastern dwarf mulga snake =

Conservation status
- Least Concern (IUCN 3.1)

Scientific classification
- Kingdom: Animalia
- Phylum: Chordata
- Class: Reptilia
- Order: Squamata
- Suborder: Serpentes
- Family: Elapidae
- Genus: Pseudechis
- Species: P. pailsei

Binomial name
- Pseudechis pailsei (Hoser, 1998)

Synonyms
- Pailsus pailsei Hoser, 1998; Pailsus pailsi — Wüster et al., 2001; Pseudechis pailsei — Wüster et al., 2005; Pseudechis pailsi — Maddock et al., 2017

Species of snake

The eastern dwarf mulga snake (Pseudechis pailsei), also known commonly as the eastern pygmy mulga snake and the false king brown snake, is a species of venomous snake in the family Elapidae. The species, which is native to Australia, was genetically confirmed as a distinct species in 2017.

== Taxonomy ==
The eastern dwarf mulga snake was originally described in 1998 as Pailsus pailsei by Raymond Hoser. Wolfgang Wüster identified that its specific name should be spelt pailsi under taxonomic rules in 2001. However, according to the International Code of Zoological Nomenclature (Article 32.5.1) the original spelling should still be used, even though it is an incorrect latinisation.

== Etymology ==
The specific name, pailsei, is in honour of Australian reptile breeder Roy Pails (born 1956).

== Geographic distribution ==
Pseudechis pailsei is found in northern Queensland, Australia.

== Habitat ==
The preferred natural habitat of Pseudechis pailsei is rocky areas of grassland and shrubland.

== Description ==
Pseudechis pailsei may attain a total length (tail included) of 107 cm (42 in).
