= Paracalliopiidae =

Scientific classification
- Kingdom: Animalia
- Phylum: Arthropoda
- Clade: Pancrustacea
- Class: Malacostraca
- Order: Amphipoda
- Suborder: Amphilochidea
- Infraorder: Amphilochida
- Parvorder: Oedicerotidira
- Superfamily: Oedicerotoidea
- Family: Paracalliopiidae; Barnard & Karaman, 1982

Family of crustaceans

Paracalliopiidae is a family of amphipods, containing the following genera:

- Doowia Barnard & Drummond, 1987
- Indocalliope Barnard & Karaman, 1982
- Katacalliope Barnard & Drummond, 1984
- Paracalliope Stebbing, 1899
- Yhi Barnard & Thomas, 1991
