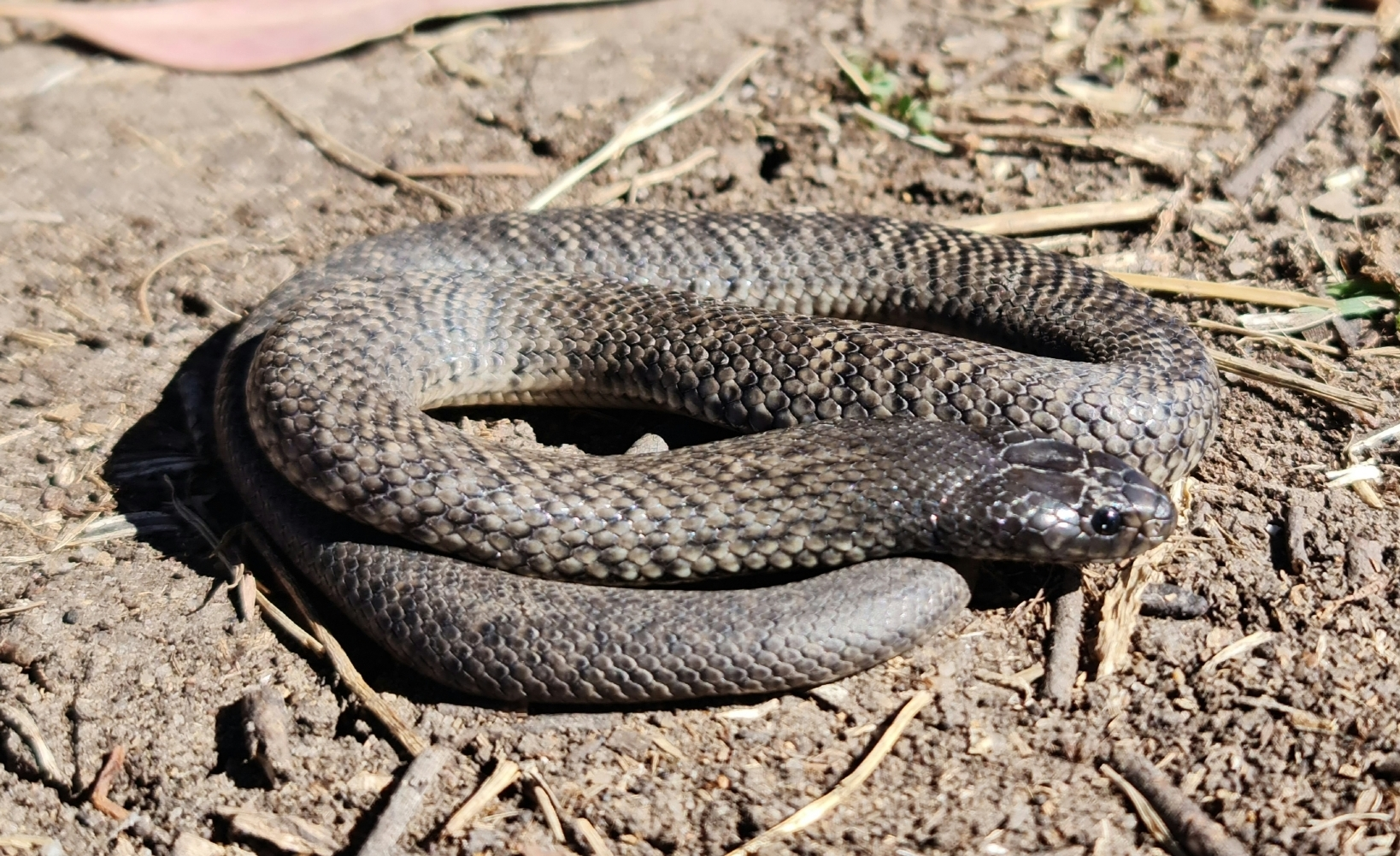

Conservation status
- Least Concern (IUCN 3.1)

Scientific classification
- Kingdom: Animalia
- Phylum: Chordata
- Class: Reptilia
- Order: Squamata
- Suborder: Serpentes
- Family: Elapidae
- Genus: Pseudechis
- Species: P. guttatus

Binomial name
- Pseudechis guttatus De Vis, 1905

Synonyms
- Pseudechis guttata De Vis, 1905; Pseudechis guttatus — Cogger, 1983

= Blue-bellied black snake =

Venomous snake native to northeastern Australia

The blue-bellied black snake (Pseudechis guttatus), also known commonly as the spotted black snake, is a species of extremely venomous snake in the family Elapidae. The species is native to eastern Australia. The adult blue-bellied black snake can reach a total length of 1.5 meters. The colour of its surface is predominantly a dark blue or black colour, with the underside ranging from a dark grey to black. Some individuals can also be cream or pale grey in colouring with black-inflected scales, giving a spotted appearance. In all individuals the head is uniformly dark. The blue-bellied black snake is found in most habitats including open forests, grasslands and wetlands. It eats a variety of frogs, lizards and small mammals. The species is oviparous.

== Description ==
On average, P. guttatus grows to a total length (including tail) of 1.2 m (3.9 ft), but some specimens have been found to measure as long as 1.5 m (4.9 ft).

== Distribution and habitat ==
P. guttatus is endemic to the inland areas of south-eastern Queensland and north-eastern New South Wales, Australia. The preferred natural habitats of P. guttatus are grassland, shrubland, and savanna.

== Diet ==
P. guttatus is carnivorous. Its diet consists of frogs, lizards, and small mammals.

== Reproduction ==
P. guttatus, like most other snakes, is oviparous, laying 7–12 eggs during the breeding season.

== Venom ==
The average venom ejection of P. guttatus is unknown. The snake's venom is the second most toxic of all the Australian black snakes. It is naturally very shy, and will warn threats away by hissing loudly and flattening it's forebody into a low S-shape. It will not bite unless provoked (by being stepped on by a boot, prodded by a stick, etc.), and will hang onto the victim if it does. A human, if bitten, may suffer severe pain, nausea, vomiting, diarrhoea, diaphoresis and regional lymphadenopathy at the location of the bite, similar to a red-bellied black snake's bite symptoms. Bites are infrequent. If bitten, tiger snake antivenom is the preferred treatment.
