= Raymond Hoser =

Australian snake-catcher and author (born 1962)

- Born: Raymond Terrence Hoser; 1962 (age 63–64); United Kingdom
- Education: University of Sydney
- Website: www.raymondhoser.com

Raymond Terrence Hoser (born 1962) is an Australian snake-catcher and author.

Hoser's work on herpetology is controversial, including his advocacy of the surgical alteration of captive snakes to remove their venom glands and his self-published herpetological taxonomy, which has been described as "taxonomic vandalism".

== Career ==
=== Taxonomy ===
Hoser has written on herpetology, with a focus on the taxonomy of Australian snakes. He has written and edited for Monitor, an amateur magazine of the Victorian Herpetological Society. Since 2009, he has self-published the Australasian Journal of Herpetology. Hoser has described several species and genera of reptiles, including Pseudechis pailsei and Acanthophis wellsi (snakes in the family Elapidae).

A 2021 review identified 1,795 taxon names proposed by Hoser, and found that 59 of his reptile names had been over-written by later herpetologists. His proposal to establish a genus of Pythonidae containing the reticulated and Timor pythons was affirmed by a later phylogenetic study, but Reynolds et al. 2013, suggest the name Malayopython be used in place of Hoser's 2004 Broghammerus. Similarly, for two species of alligator snapping turtle, Thomas et al. 2014 give new names to over-write Hoser's names. The new names have found widespread acceptance in preference of Hoser's names.

Professional academic herpetologists have had significant criticism of his taxonomic work. Hoser's work has been described as "amateur", "vanity publishing", not peer-reviewed, "taxonomic vandalism", extensively plagiarised, and a source of confusion. In particular, several of his descriptions are said to lack adequate detail and reference to type specimens. As a result, herpetological societies in America, Europe and Africa have resolved to ignore or over-write Hoser's nomenclature.

Hoser responded to the over-writing by declaring the new names to be junior synonyms which thus are invalid according to the rules of the International Code of Zoological Nomenclature (the Code). In 2013, he applied to the International Commission on Zoological Nomenclature (ICZN) to confirm that his names were "available" (i.e. had been validly published), using the name Spracklandus as a test case. In 2021, the ICZN responded that it found "no basis under the provisions of the Code for regarding the name Spracklandus as unavailable, nor for regarding any of issues 1–24 of Australasian Journal of Herpetology as being unpublished in the sense of the Code". However, ICZN Commissioner Frank Krell wrote that herpetologists' voluntary decision to ignore and overwrite Hoser's names "might be a better way forward than a suppression of Hoser's works by the ICZN", and most herpetologists have not used Hoser's names in subsequent publications.

=== Snake handling ===
Hoser has a business as a snake handler. Operating as "Snakebusters" among other names, he provides reptiles for children's birthday parties and catches snakes found in urban areas to move them elsewhere. As part of his business, he claims "Snakeman" (and others) as trademarks, names which he has taken steps to defend on several occasions. He once criticised the zookeeper, conservationist and television personality Steve Irwin for giving people "false ideas about how to behave around snakes".

Hoser is an advocate of surgically altering snakes to inhibit the production of venom. The procedure for creating venomoid snakes is regarded as controversial.

In May 2023, Two Wrongs nightclub in Melbourne was criticised for having snakes and at least one baby crocodile for an event where they were touched and held by guests. Hoser, who provided the animals, defended the event. The incident was investigated by the RSPCA and the Victorian Department of Energy, Environment, and Climate Action.

== Legal proceedings ==
Hoser is a self-described "anti-corruption crusader" and whistleblower who has self-published books alleging corruption in Australia. In 2001, the Victorian Supreme Court found Hoser liable for contempt of court and fined him $5,000 after he published names of two county court judges and two magistrates in a book entitled Victoria Police Corruption with allegations of bias and improper conduct. Hoser's 2003 appeal against the charge was unsuccessful and he was found guilty of a second contempt charge which was originally dismissed.

A 2008 government tribunal ruled that Hoser's performance of venomoid surgery was illegal under the law of Victoria and that his venomoid snakes cannot be handled by members of the public in the state due to the risk of the venom glands regrowing.

In 2011, Hoser was convicted and fined $12,000 in the County Court for demonstrating with venomous snakes less than three metres from the public, working in accessible pits and demonstrating in a way that put the animals at risk of theft. He allowed his 10-year-old daughter to be bitten five times by venomoid specimens of two species of highly venomous snakes, an inland taipan and a common death adder, to demonstrate that his venomoid snakes were harmless. The manager of the shopping centre where Hoser performed claimed that Hoser's performance was not consistent with his act description and said that he would not be allowed back. Following this incident, the Victorian Department of Sustainability and Environment suspended Hoser's commercial wildlife demonstrator license and his authorisation to hold snake-handling courses and use wildlife in film and television. Hoser said that he would apply to the courts for an emergency injunction against this suspension.

In 2012, Judge Jenkins found that Hoser intentionally allowed two snakes to bite his daughter seven times, and compromised both the safety of the audience and the welfare of the snakes during his demonstration. In March 2012, Jenkins denied an appeal by Hoser of the DSE actions against him, fining him $4,000 under the Wildlife Safety Act and ordering him to pay the costs of the DSE of $8,000. Jenkins found that "through his demeanour and evidence, displayed a contempt and reckless disregard for the licence conditions. He has conducted his demonstrations in a manner which seriously compromises the welfare of the snakes he is displaying and the safety and well-being of audience members, including children and, on one occasion, his own daughter." In March 2013, Justice Robert Redlich of the Victoria Court of Appeal recommended that Hoser hire a lawyer to represent him rather than representing himself, and adjourned the hearing until 13 June 2013. In May 2013, Hoser appealed to the Victoria Court of Appeal in an attempt to overturn the Department of Sustainability and Environment's (DSE) decision to cancel his wildlife demonstrators licence and Victorian Civil and Administrative Tribunal (VCAT) deputy president Judge Pamela Jenkins's decision in 2012 to uphold the DSE cancellation of his license.

In 2015, VCAT member Gerard Butcher cleared Hoser to resume demonstrations for schoolchildren.

In 2018, Hoser sued Sportsbet, alleging the bookmaker infringed on his trademark by using the words "snake man" in three TV ads. In October 2018, an agreement was reached whereby the judge dismissed the claim for one of three relevant adverts and Sportsbet agreed to stop running all three allegedly offending adverts, and proceedings were discontinued in relation to the two adverts that the judge had not ruled on.

== Candidate for local and state government ==
Hoser ran in the 1999 Frankston East state supplementary election. He received the fewest votes (11 out of 26,842 votes or 0.04% of first preference votes).

In 2012, Hoser ran for council of the City of Manningham (Mullum Mullum ward), but failed to win one of three positions. He received 4.31% of the primary vote.

Hoser announced his candidacy for the 2023 Warrandyte state by-election but his name did not appear on the Victorian Electoral Commission's list of candidates when nominations for independent candidates closed on 10 August 2023.
