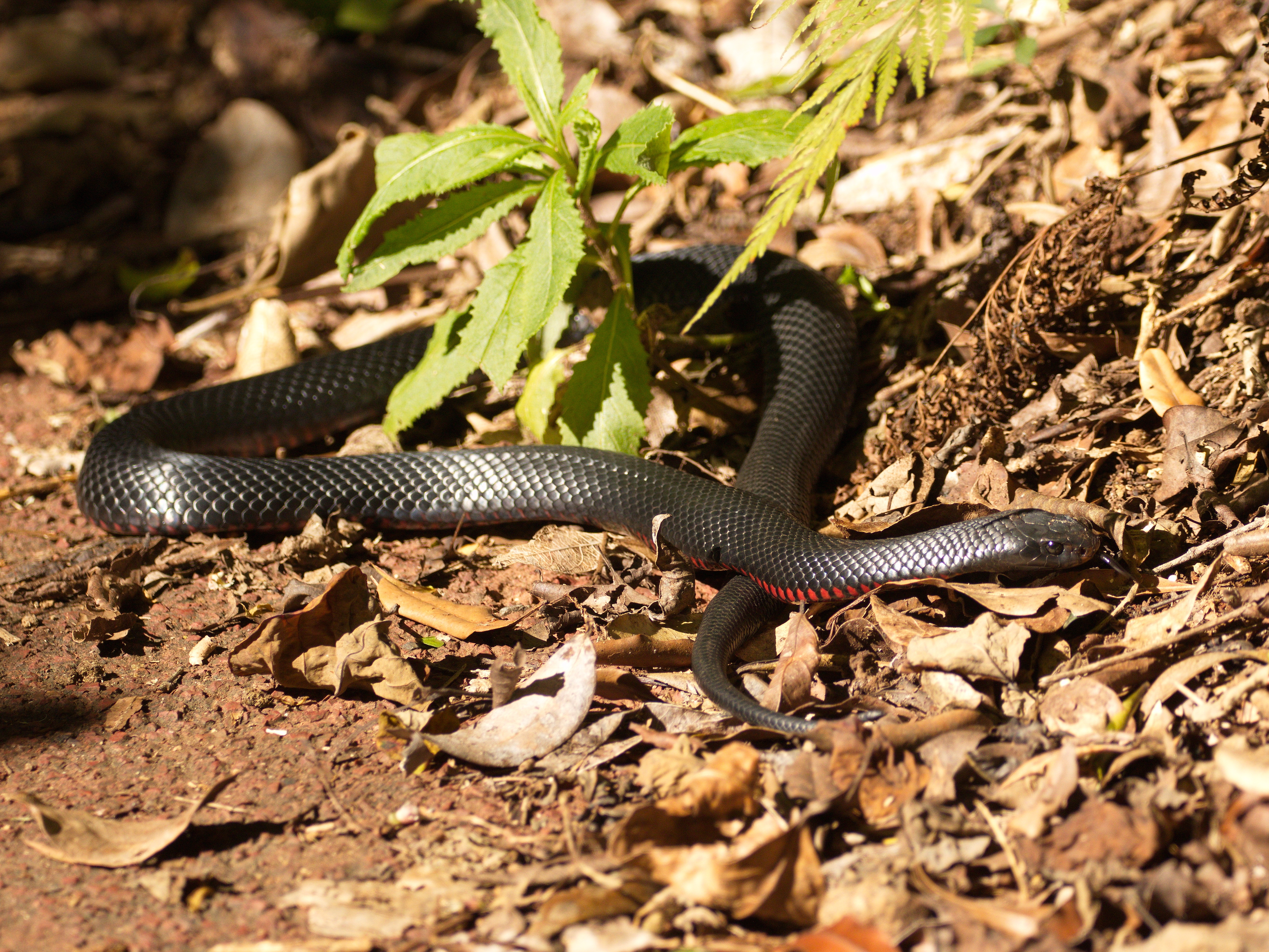
- A red-bellied black snake in Lamington National Park, Queensland

Conservation status
- Least Concern (IUCN 3.1)

Scientific classification
- Kingdom: Animalia
- Phylum: Chordata
- Class: Reptilia
- Order: Squamata
- Suborder: Serpentes
- Family: Elapidae
- Genus: Pseudechis
- Species: P. porphyriacus

Binomial name
- Pseudechis porphyriacus (Shaw, 1794)
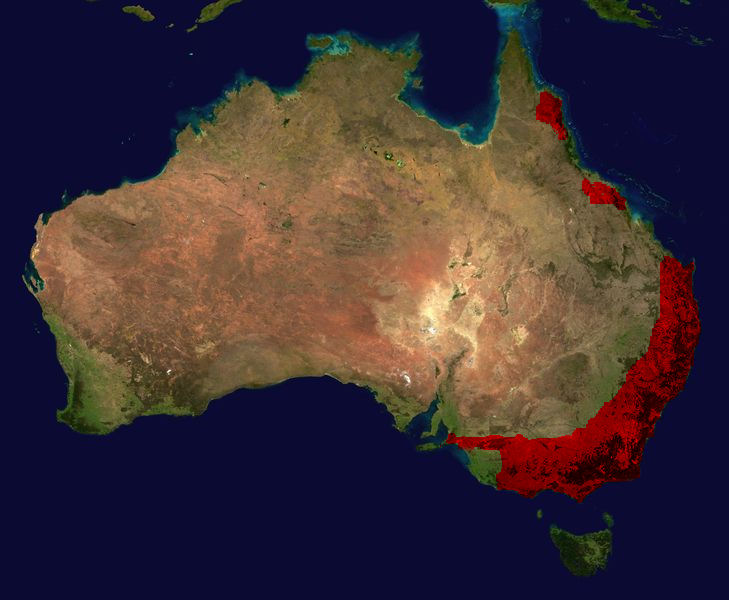
- Range of red-bellied black snake (in red)

Synonyms
- List: Coluber porphyriacus Shaw, 1794; Trimeresurus leptocephalus Lacépède, 1804; Acanthophis tortor Lesson, 1830; Naja porphyrica Schlegel, 1837; Trimeresurus porphyreus A.M.C. Duméril & Bibron, 1854; Pseudechis porphyraicus [sic] F. McCoy, 1867; Pseudechys [sic] porphyriacus — F. McCoy, 1878; Pseudechis porphyriacus — Cogger, 1983

= Red-bellied black snake =

Venomous snake native to eastern Australia

The red-bellied black snake (Pseudechis porphyriacus) is a species of venomous snake in the family Elapidae. The species is indigenous to Australia. Originally described by George Shaw in 1794 as a species new to science, it is one of eastern Australia's most commonly encountered snakes. Averaging around 1.25 m (4 ft 1 in) in total length (tail included), it has glossy black upperparts, bright red or orange flanks, and a pink or dull red belly. It is not aggressive and generally retreats from human encounters, but will defend itself if provoked. Although its venom can cause significant illness, no deaths have been recorded from its bite, which is less venomous than other Australian elapid snakes. The venom contains neurotoxins, myotoxins, and coagulants and has haemolytic properties. Victims can also lose their sense of smell.

Common in woodlands, forests, swamplands, and along river banks and waterways, the red-bellied black snake often ventures into nearby urban areas. It forages in bodies of shallow water, commonly with tangles of water plants and logs, where it hunts its main prey item, frogs, as well as fish, reptiles, and small mammals. The snake is a least-concern species according to the IUCN, but its numbers are thought to be declining due to habitat fragmentation and decline of frog populations.

== Taxonomy and etymology ==
The red-bellied black snake was first described and named by English naturalist George Shaw in Zoology of New Holland (1794) as Coluber porphyriacus. Incorrectly assuming it was harmless and not venomous, he wrote, "This beautiful snake, which appears to be unprovided with tubular teeth or fangs, and consequently not of a venomous nature, is three, sometimes four, feet in nature." The specific name, porphyriacus, is derived from the Greek porphyrous, which can mean "dark purple", "red-purple" or "beauteous". It was the first Australian elapid described. The syntype is presumed lost. French naturalist Bernard Germain de Lacépède described it under the name Trimeresurus leptocephalus in 1804. His countryman René Lesson described it as Acanthophis tortor in 1826. German biologist Hermann Schlegel felt it was allied with cobras and called it Naja porphyrica in 1837.

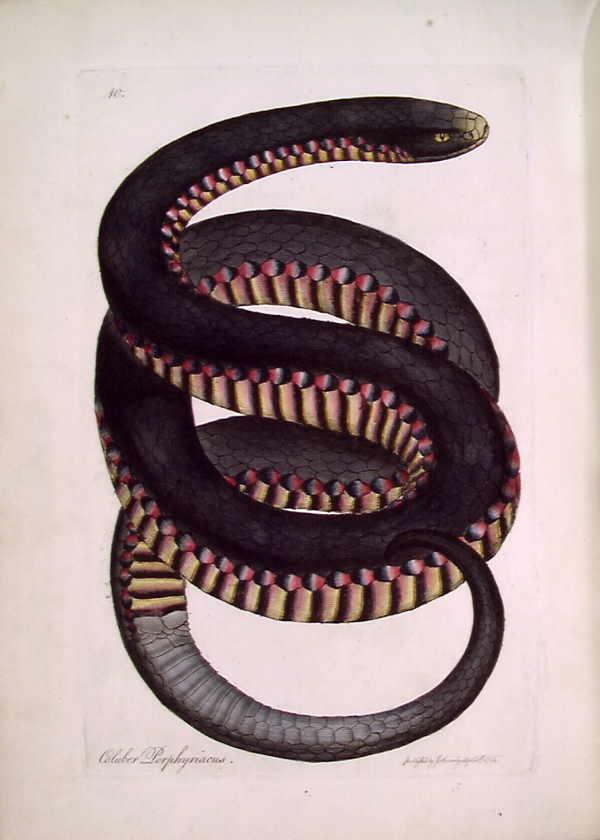
"Coluber porphyriacus", Zoology and botany of New Holland (1794), illustration from original description

The genus Pseudechis was created for this species by German biologist Johann Georg Wagler in 1830; several more species have been added to the genus subsequently. The generic name, Pseudechis, is derived from the Greek words pseudēs "false", and echis "viper". Snake expert Eric Worrell, in 1961, analysed the skulls of the genus and found that of the red-bellied black snake to be the most divergent. Its position as an early offshoot from the rest of the genus has been confirmed genetically in 2017.

In addition to red-bellied black snake, the species has been called common black snake, redbelly, and RBBS. It was known as djirrabidi to the Eora and Darug inhabitants of the Sydney basin.

== Description ==
The red-bellied black snake has a glossy black top body with a light-grey snout and brown mouth, and a completely black tail. It lacks a well-defined neck; its head merges seamlessly into the body. Its flanks are bright red or orange, fading to pink or dull red on the belly. All these scales have black margins. Snakes from northern populations tend to have lighter, more cream or pink bellies. The red-bellied black snake is on average around 1.25 m (4 ft 1 in) in total length (tail included), the longest individual recorded at 2.55 m (8 ft 4 in). Males are generally slightly larger than females. A large 2 m (6 ft 7 in) specimen caught in Newcastle has been estimated to weigh around 10 kg (22 lb). The red-bellied black snake can have a strong smell, which some field experts have used to find the snakes in the wild.

Like all elapid snakes, it is proteroglyphous (front-fanged). Juveniles are similar to the eastern small-eyed snake (Cryptophis nigrescens), with which they can be easily confused, although the latter species lacks the red flanks. Other similar species include the blue-bellied black snake (Pseudechis guttatus) and copperheads of the genus Austrelaps. An early misconception was that the red-bellied black snake was sexually dimorphic, and that the eastern brown snake (Pseudonaja textilis) was the female form. This error was recognised as such by Australian zoologist Gerard Krefft in his 1869 work Snakes of Australia.

=== Scalation ===
The number and arrangement of scales on a snake's body are a key element of identification to species level. The red-bellied black snake has 17 rows of dorsal scales at midbody, 180 to 215 ventral scales, 48 to 60 subcaudal scales (the anterior—and sometimes all—subcaudals are undivided), and a divided anal scale. (Note: A divided scale is one split down the midline into two scales.) There are two anterior and two posterior temporal scales, and the rostral shield is roughly square-shaped.

== Distribution and habitat ==
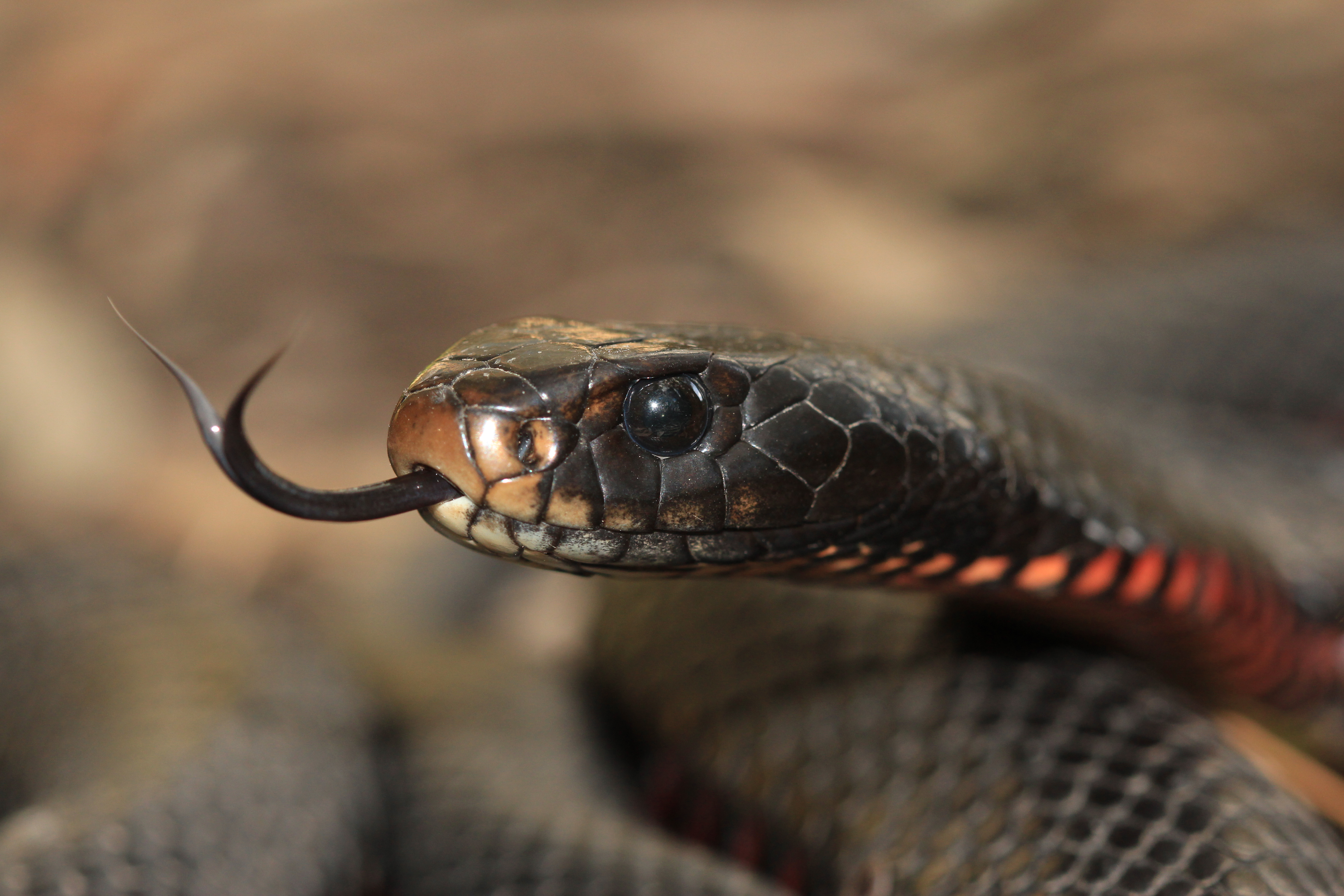
A closeup of a red-bellied black snake, showing its paler snout and forked tongue

The red-bellied black snake is native to the east coast of Australia, where it is one of the most commonly encountered snakes. It can be found in the urban forest, woodland, plains, and bushland areas of the Blue Mountains, Canberra, Sydney, Brisbane, Melbourne, Cairns, and Adelaide. The Macquarie Marshes mark a western border to its distribution in New South Wales, and Gladstone in central Queensland marks the northern limit to the main population. To the south, it occurs across eastern and central Victoria, and extends along the Murray River into South Australia. Disjunct populations occur in the southern Mount Lofty Ranges in South Australia and in North Queensland.

The red-bellied black snake is most commonly seen close to dams, streams, billabongs, and other bodies of water, although they can venture up to 100 m (350 ft) away, including into nearby backyards. In particular, it prefers areas of shallow water with tangles of water plants, logs, or debris.

== Behaviour ==
The red-bellied black snake can hide in many places in its habitat, including logs, old mammal burrows, and grass tussocks. It can flee into water and hide there; one was reported as staying submerged for 23 minutes. When swimming, it may hold its full head or its nostrils above the water's surface. At times, it may float without moving on the water surface, thus looking like a stick. Within its habitat, the red-bellied black snake appears to have a home range or territory with which it is familiar and within which it generally remains. A 1987 field study in three New South Wales localities found that these areas vary widely, from 0.02 to 40 ha (0.05 to 100 acres) in size. Within its territory, it may have some preferred places to reside.

The red-bellied black snake is generally not an aggressive species, typically withdrawing when approached. If provoked, it recoils into a striking stance as a threat, holding its head and front part of its body horizontally above the ground and widening and flattening its neck. It may bite as a last resort. It is generally active by day, though nighttime activity occasionally has been recorded. When not hunting or basking, it may be found beneath timber, rocks, and rubbish or down holes and burrows.

The red-bellied black snake is active when its body temperature is between 28 and 31 °C (82 and 88 °F). It also thermoregulates by basking in warm, sunny spots in the cool, early morning and resting in shade in the middle of hot days, and it may reduce its activity in hot, dry weather in late summer and autumn. Rather than entering true hibernation, the red-bellied black snake becomes relatively inactive over winter, retreating to cover and at times emerging on warm, sunny days. Its dark colour allows it to absorb heat from sunshine more quickly. In July 1949, six large individuals were found hibernating under a concrete slab in marshland in Woy Woy, New South Wales. Groups of up to six hibernating red-bellied black snakes have been recorded from under concrete slabs around Mount Druitt and Rooty Hill in western Sydney. Males are more active in the Southern Hemisphere spring (early October to November) as they roam looking for mates; one reportedly travelled 1,220 m (0.76 mi) in a day. In summer, both sexes are less active generally.

=== Reproduction ===
In spring, red-bellied black snake males often engage in ritualised combat for 2 to 30 minutes, even attacking other males already mating with females. They wrestle vigorously, but rarely bite, and engage in head-pushing contests, in which each snake using his chin tries to push his opponent's head downward.

The male seeks out a female and rubs his chin on her body, and may twitch, hiss, and rarely bite as he becomes aroused. The female indicates readiness to mate by straightening out, thus allowing their bodies to align. Gravidity takes place from early spring to late summer. Females become much less active and band together in small groups in late pregnancy. They share the same retreat and bask in the sun together. The red-bellied black snake is ovoviviparous; that is, it gives birth to live young in individual membranous sacs, after 14 weeks of gestation, usually in February or March. The young, numbering between eight and 40, emerge from their sacs very shortly after birth, and have an average length around 12.2 cm (4.8 in). Young snakes almost triple their length and increase their weight 18-fold in their first year of life, and are sexually mature when they reach a snout-to-vent length (SVL) of 78 cm (31 in) for males and 88 cm (35 in) for females. Females can breed at around 31 months of age, while males can slightly earlier. The red-bellied black snake can live up to 25 years.

=== Diet ===
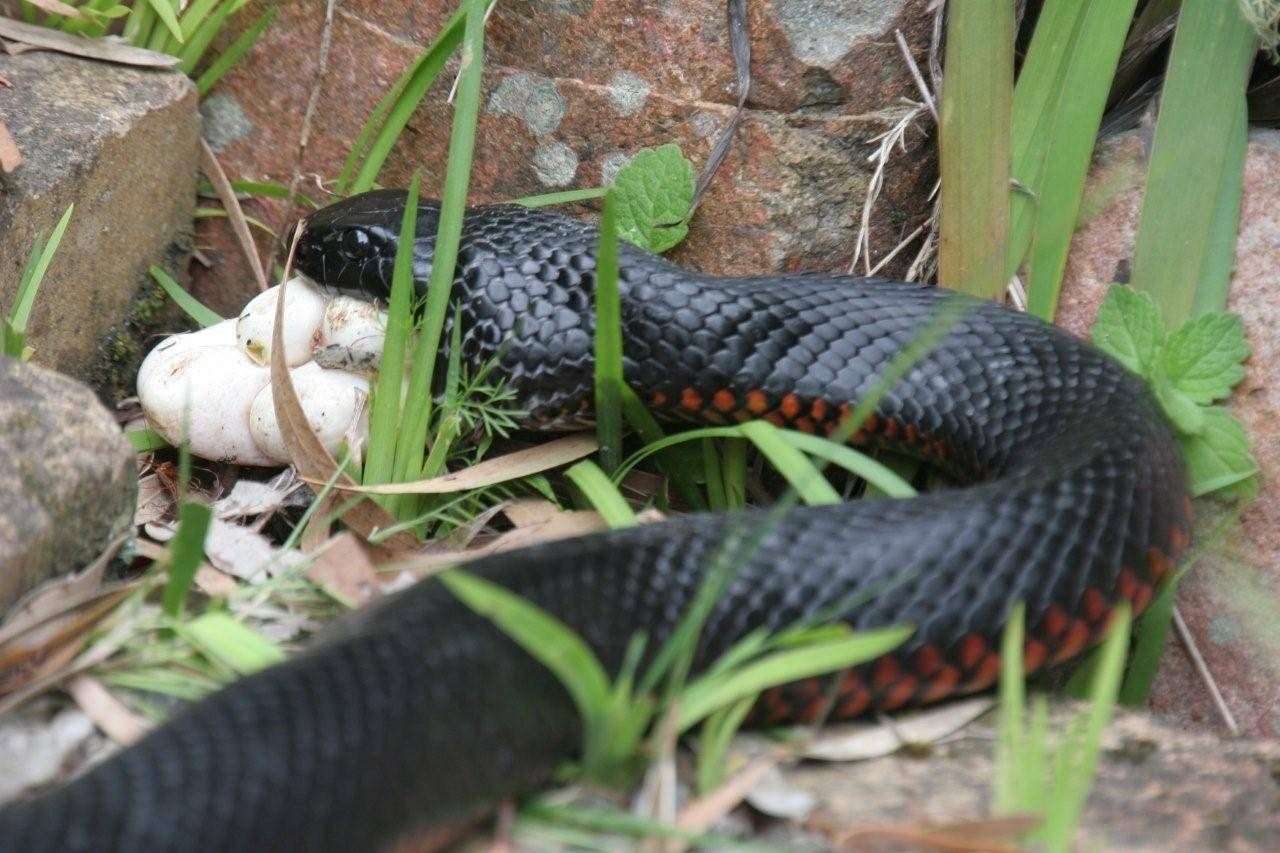
Red-bellied black snake eating the eggs of a green tree snake near Dungog, New South Wales

The diet of the red-bellied black snake primarily consists of frogs, but it also preys on reptiles (such as lizards) and small mammals. It also eats other snakes, commonly the eastern brown snake (Pseudonaja textilis) and even its own species. Fish and tadpoles are hunted in water. The red-bellied black snake may hunt on or under the water surface, and prey can be eaten underwater or brought to the surface. It has been recorded stirring up substrate, possibly to disturb prey. As the red-bellied black snake grows and matures, it continues to eat the same size prey, but adds larger animals, as well. Although it prefers live food, the red-bellied black snake has been reported eating frogs squashed by cars.

The red-bellied black snake is susceptible to cane toad (Rhinella marina) toxins, although it is thought to have evolved in toad-inhabited regions of Australia to have increased resistance to toad toxin and decreased preference for toads as prey.

== Venom ==
Early settlers feared the red-bellied black snake, though it turned out to be much less dangerous than many other species. The murine median lethal dose (LD_{50}) is 2.52 mg/kg when administered subcutaneously. A red-bellied black snake yields an average of 37 mg of venom when milked, with the maximum recorded being 94 mg. It accounted for 16% of identified snakebite victims in Australia between 2005 and 2015, with no deaths recorded. Its venom contains neurotoxins, myotoxins, and coagulants and also has haemolytic properties.

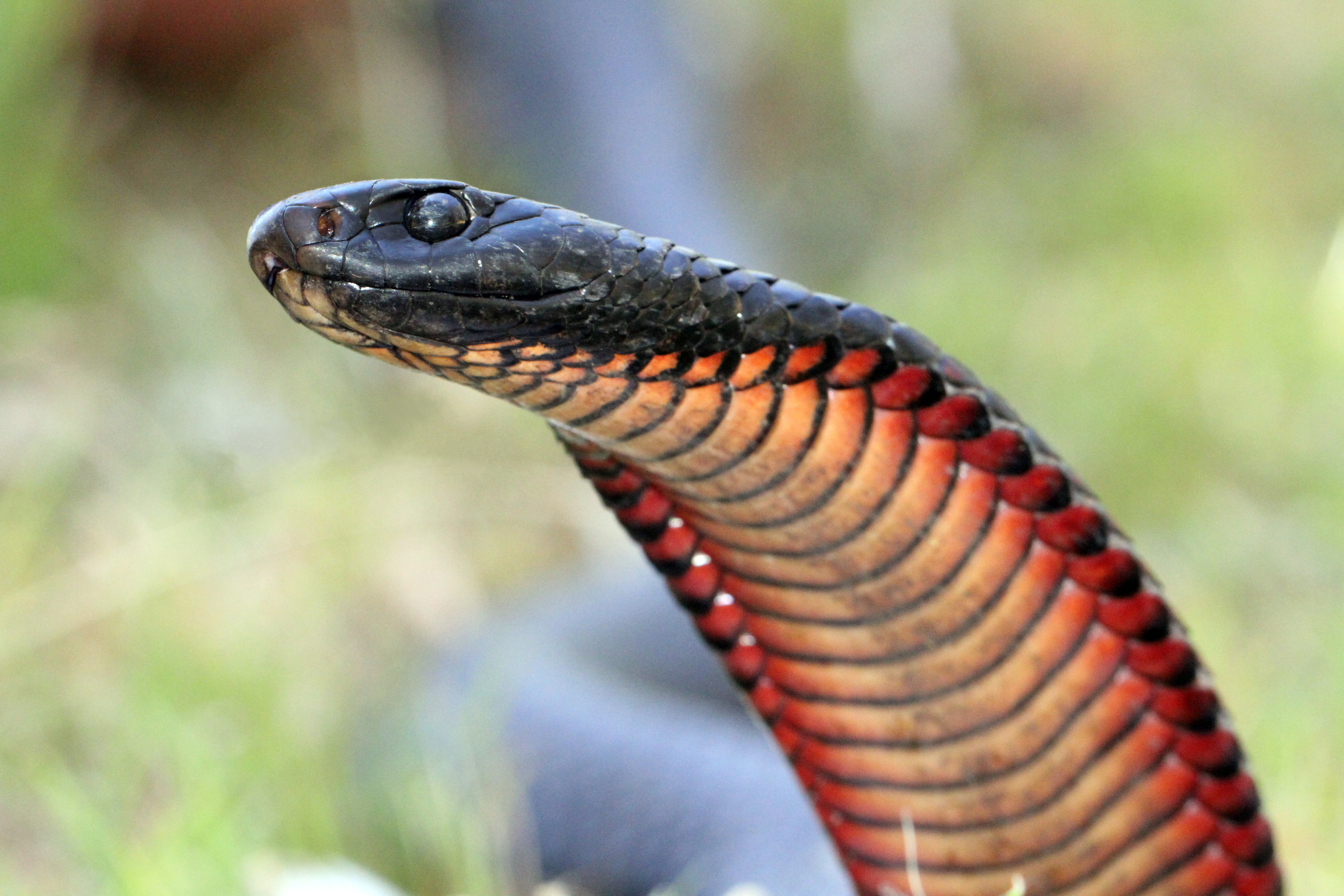
Rearing in an aggressive posture, flattening of neck

Bites from red-bellied black snakes can be very painful—needing analgesia—and result in local swelling, prolonged bleeding, and even local necrosis, particularly if the bite is on a finger. Severe local reactions may require surgical debridement or even amputation. Symptoms of systemic envenomation—including nausea, vomiting, headache, abdominal pain, diarrhoea, or excessive sweating—were thought to be rare, but a 2010 review found they occurred in most bite victims. Most people also go on to develop an anticoagulant coagulopathy in a few hours. This is characterised by a raised activated partial thromboplastin time (aPTT), and subsides over 24 hours. It resolves quickly with antivenom. A few people go on to develop a myotoxicity and associated generalised muscle pain and occasionally weakness, which may last up to 7 days. Patients may suffer a loss of sense of smell (anosmia); this is unrelated to the severity of the envenoming and can be temporary or permanent. Although the venom contains the three-finger toxin α-elapitoxin-Ppr1, which acts as a neurotoxin in laboratory experiments, neurotoxic symptoms are generally absent in clinical cases.

A biologically active agent—pseudexin—was isolated from red-bellied black snake venom in 1981. Making up 25% of the venom, it is a single polypeptide chain with a molecular weight around 16.5 kilodaltons. In 1989, it was found to be composed of three phospholipase A2 isoenzymes. If antivenom is indicated, red-bellied black snake bites are generally treated with tiger snake antivenom. While black snake antivenom can be used, tiger snake antivenom can be used at a lower volume and is a cheaper treatment.

It is the most commonly reported species responsible for envenomed dogs in New South Wales. In 2006, a 12-year-old golden retriever suffered rhabdomyolysis and acute kidney injury secondary to a red-bellied black snake bite. Laboratory testing has found that cats are relatively resistant to the venom, with a lethal dose as high as 7 mg/kg.

== Conservation and threats ==
The red-bellied black snake is a least-concern species according to the International Union for Conservation of Nature. Its preferred habitat has been particularly vulnerable to urban development and is highly fragmented, and a widespread decline in frogs, which are its preferred prey, has occurred. Snake numbers appear to have declined. Feral cats are known to prey on red-bellied black snakes, while young snakes presumably are taken by laughing kookaburras (Dacelo novaeguineae), brown falcons (Falco berigora), and other raptors.

== Captivity ==
One of the snakes commonly kept as pets in Australia, the red-bellied black snake adapts readily to captivity and lives on a supply of mice, though it can also survive on fish fillets, chicken, and dog food.
