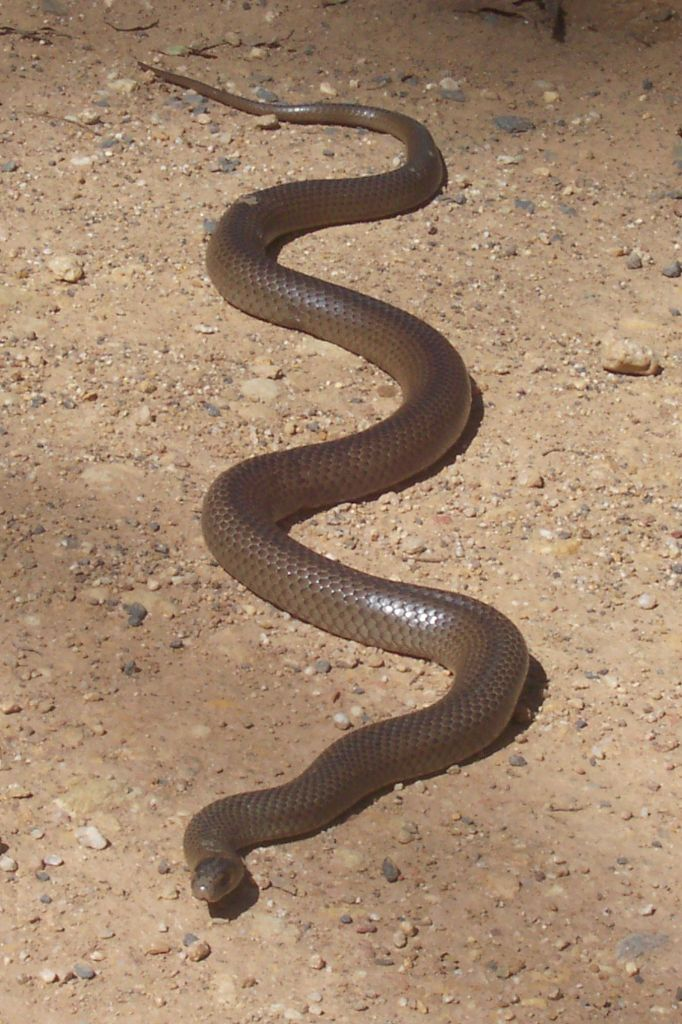

Conservation status
- Least Concern (IUCN 3.1)

Scientific classification
- Kingdom: Animalia
- Phylum: Chordata
- Class: Reptilia
- Order: Squamata
- Suborder: Serpentes
- Family: Elapidae
- Genus: Pseudonaja
- Species: P. textilis

Binomial name
- Pseudonaja textilis (A.M.C. Duméril, Bibron and A.H.A. Duméril, 1854)
- Range of eastern brown snake (in green)

Synonyms
- List: Furina textilis A.M.C. Duméril, Bibron & A.H.A. Duméril, 1854; Pseudoelaps superciliosus Fischer, 1856; Demansia annulata Günther, 1858; Pseudoelaps sordelii Jan, 1859; Pseudoelaps kubingii Jan, 1859; Pseudonaia textilis — Krefft, 1862; Diemenia textilis — Boulenger, 1896; Demansia textilis — Waite, 1929; Pseudonaja textilis — McDowell, 1967; Pseudonaja ohnoi Wells & Wellington, 1985; Pseudonaja textilis pughi Hoser, 2003

= Eastern brown snake =

Highly venomous snake native to Australia

The eastern brown snake (Pseudonaja textilis), often referred to as the common brown snake, is a species of extremely venomous snake in the family Elapidae. The species is native to eastern and central Australia and southern New Guinea. It was first described by André Marie Constant Duméril, Gabriel Bibron, and Auguste Duméril in 1854. The adult eastern brown snake has a slender build and can grow to 2 m (7 ft) in length. The colour of its surface ranges from pale brown to black, while its underside is pale cream-yellow, often with orange or grey splotches. The eastern brown snake is found in most habitats except dense forests, often in farmland and on the outskirts of urban areas, as such places are populated by its main prey, the house mouse. The species is oviparous. The International Union for Conservation of Nature classifies the snake as a least-concern species, though its status in New Guinea is unclear.

It is considered the world's second-most venomous land snake after the inland taipan (Oxyuranus microlepidotus), based on its LD_{50} value (subcutaneous) in mice. (Note: Although many Australian snakes are highly venomous, the number of deaths from snakebite in Australia is minuscule when compared to India or Africa. Hence, the labelling of some Australian species as "most dangerous" has been challenged.) The main effects of its venom are on the circulatory system: coagulopathy, haemorrhage (bleeding), cardiovascular collapse, and cardiac arrest. One of the main components of the venom is the prothrombinase complex pseutarin-C, which breaks down prothrombin.

== Taxonomy ==
John White, the surgeon-general of the First Fleet to New South Wales, wrote, A Journal of a Voyage to New South Wales in 1790, which described many Australian animal species for the first time. In it, he reported a snake that fits the description of the eastern brown snake, but did not name it. French zoologists André Marie Constant Duméril, Gabriel Bibron, and Auguste Duméril were the first to describe the species in 1854. They gave it the binomial name Furina textilis – furine tricotée (knitted furin) in French – from a specimen collected in October 1846 by Jules Verreaux, remarking that the fine-meshed pattern on the snake's body reminded him of fine stockings, which was the inspiration for the name. Due to differences in appearance, different specimens of the eastern brown snake were categorised as different species in the early 19th century. German herpetologist Johann Gustav Fischer described it as Pseudoelaps superciliosus in 1856, from a specimen collected from Sydney. German-British zoologist Albert Günther described the species as Demansia annulata in 1858. Italian naturalist Giorgio Jan named Pseudoelaps sordellii and Pseudoelaps kubingii in 1859.

Gerard Krefft, curator of the Australian Museum, reclassified Duméril, Bibron, and Duméril's species in the genus Pseudonaia [sic] in 1862 after collecting multiple specimens and establishing that the markings of young snakes faded as they grew into adult brown snakes. He concluded the original description was based on an immature specimen and sent an adult to Günther, who catalogued it under the new name the same year when cataloguing new species of snakes in the British Museum's collection. After examining all specimens, Günther concluded that Furina textilis and Diemansia annulata were named for young specimens and Pseudoelaps superciliosus, P. sordelli, and P. kubingii were named for adults, and all represented the same species, which he called Diemenia superciliosa. Belgian-British naturalist George Albert Boulenger called it Diemenia textilis in 1896, acknowledging Duméril, Bibron, and Duméril's name as having priority. In subsequent literature, it was known as Demansia textilis as Diemenia was regarded as an alternate spelling of Demansia.

The brown snakes were moved from Diemenia/Demansia to Pseudonaja by Australian naturalist Eric Worrell in 1961 on the basis of skull morphology, and upheld by American herpetologist Samuel Booker McDowell in 1967 on the basis of the muscles of the venom glands. This classification has been followed by subsequent authors. In 2002, Australian herpetologist Richard W. Wells split the genus Pseudonaja, placing the eastern brown snake in the new genus Euprepiosoma, though this has not been recognised by other authors, and Wells has been strongly criticised for a lack of rigour in his research.

Within the genus Pseudonaja, the eastern brown snake has the largest diploid number of chromosomes at 38; those of the other species range from 30 to 36. A 2008 study of mitochondrial DNA across its range showed three broad lineages – a southeastern clade from South Australia, Victoria, and southeastern and coastal New South Wales; a northeastern clade from northern and western New South Wales and Queensland; and a central (and presumably northern) Australian clade from the Northern Territory. The central Australian clade had colonised the region around Merauke in southern West Papua, and the northeastern clade had colonised Milne Bay, Oro, and Central Provinces in eastern Papua New Guinea in the Pleistocene via landbridges between Australia and New Guinea.

P. textilis is monotypic. Raymond Hoser described all New Guinea populations as Ps. t. pughi based on a differing maxillary tooth count from Australian populations; this difference was inconsistent, and as no single New Guinea population is genetically distinct, the taxon is not recognised. Wells and C. Ross Wellington described Pseudonaja ohnoi in 1985 from a large specimen from Mount Gillen near Alice Springs, distinguishing it on the basis of scale numbers, but it is not regarded as distinct.

The species is commonly called the eastern brown snake or common brown snake. It was known as marragawan to the Eora and Darug inhabitants of the Sydney basin. To the Dharawal of the Illawarra, it is goobalaang. The Dharawal and Awabakal held ceremonies for the eastern brown snake. Warralang is the reconstructed name in the Wiradjuri language of southern New South Wales.

== Description ==
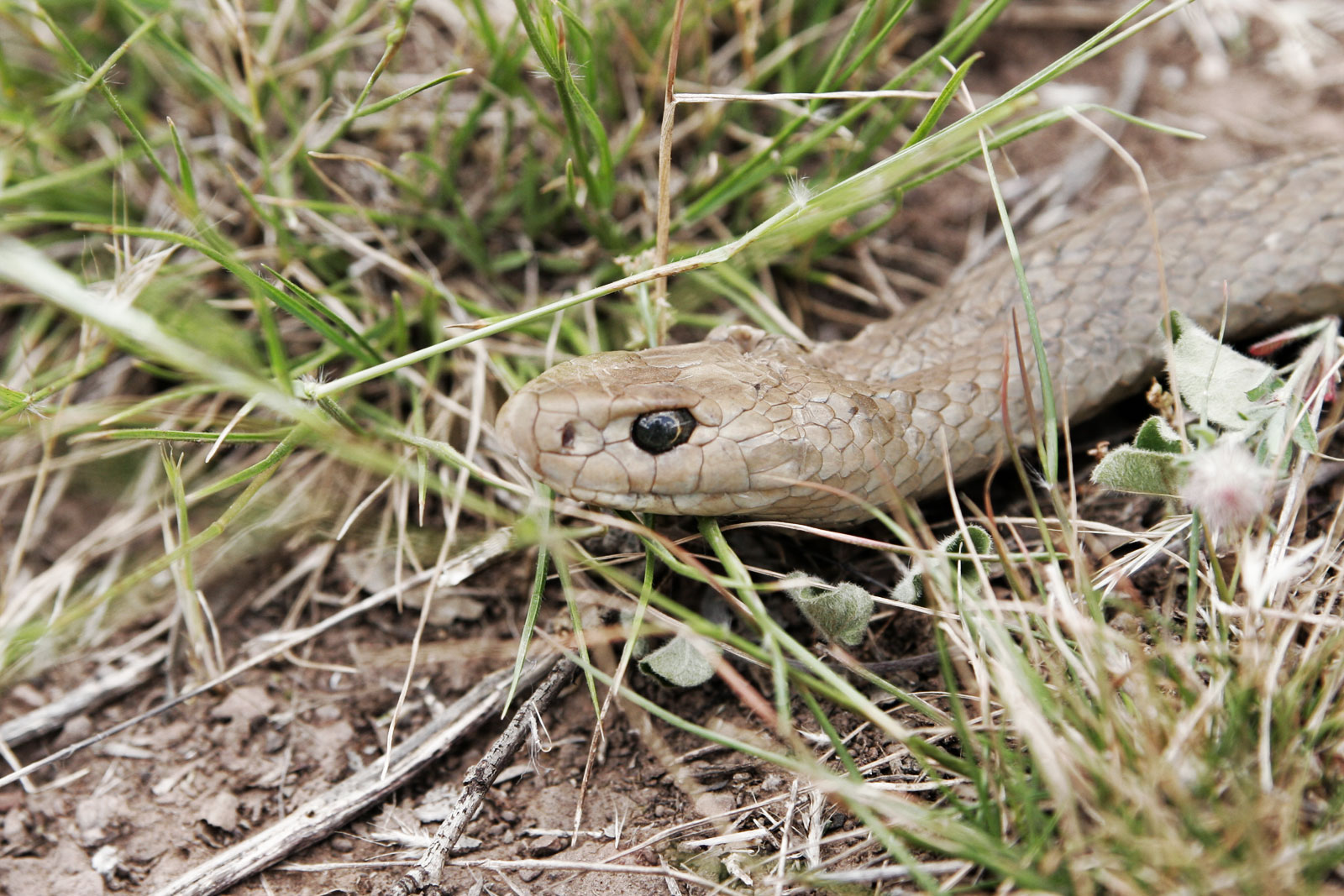
Closeup of head

The eastern brown snake is of slender to average build with no demarcation between its head and neck. Its snout appears rounded when viewed from above. Most specimens have a total length (including tail) up to 1.5 m (4.9 ft), with some large individuals reaching 2 m (6.6 ft). The maximum recorded total length for the species is 2.4 m (7.9 ft). Evidence indicates that snakes from the northern populations tend to be larger than those from southern populations. The adult eastern brown snake is variable in colour. Its upper parts range from pale to dark brown, or sometimes shades of orange or russet, with the pigment more richly coloured in the posterior part of the dorsal scales. Eastern brown snakes from Merauke have tan to olive upper parts, while those from eastern Papua New Guinea are very dark grey-brown to blackish.

The eastern brown snake's fangs are small compared to those of other Australian venomous snakes, averaging 2.8 mm (0.11 in) in length or up to 4 mm (0.16 in) in larger specimens, and are 11 mm (0.43 in) apart. The tongue is dark. The iris is blackish with a paler yellow-brown or orange ring around the pupil. The snake's chin and under parts are cream or pale yellow, sometimes fading to brown or grey-brown towards the tail. Often, orange, brown, or dark grey blotches occur on the under parts, more prominent anteriorly. The ventral scales are often edged with dark brown on their posterior edges.

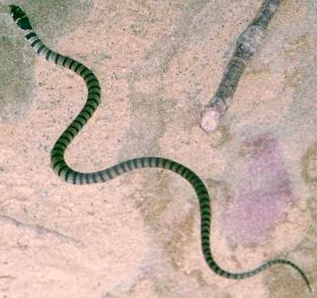
Juvenile, showing bands and black nape

Juveniles can vary in markings, but generally have a black head, with a lighter brown snout and band behind, and a black nuchal band. Their bodies can be uniform brown, or have many black bands, or a reticulated pattern, with all darker markings fading with age. Snake clutches in colder areas tend have a higher proportion of young snakes with banded markings on their bodies.

Its yellowish under parts serve to distinguish it from the dugite (Pseudonaja affinis) and peninsula brown snake (P. inframacula), which are entirely brown or brown with grey under parts. The eastern brown snake has flesh-pink skin inside its mouth, whereas the northern brown snake and western brown snake have black skin. Large eastern brown snakes are often confused with mulga snakes (Pseudechis australis), whose habitat they share in many areas, but may be distinguished by their smaller heads. Juvenile eastern brown snakes have head markings similar to red-naped snakes (Furina diadema), grey snakes (Hemiaspis damelii), Dwyer's snakes (Suta dwyeri), and the curl snake (Suta suta).

=== Scalation ===
The number and arrangement of scales on a snake's body are a key element of identification to species level. The eastern brown snake has 17 rows of dorsal scales at midbody, 192 to 231 ventral scales, 45 to 75 divided subcaudal scales (occasionally some of the anterior ones are undivided), and a divided anal scale. (Note: A divided scale is one split down the midline into two scales.) Its mouth is bordered by six supralabial scales above, and seven (rarely eight) sublabial scales below. Its nasal scale is almost always undivided, and rarely partly divided. Each eye is bordered posteriorly by two or rarely three postocular scales.

== Distribution and habitat ==
The eastern brown snake is found along the east coast of Australia, from Malanda in far north Queensland, along the coasts and inland ranges of Queensland, New South Wales, Victoria, and to the Yorke Peninsula in South Australia. Disjunct populations occur on the Barkly Tableland and the MacDonnell Ranges in the Northern Territory. and the far east of the Kimberley in Western Australia, and discontinuously in parts of New Guinea, specifically northern Milne Bay Province and Central Province in Papua New Guinea, and the Merauke region of South Papua, in the Indonesian part of New Guinea. It is common in southeastern Queensland between Ipswich and Beenleigh.

The eastern brown snake occupies a varied range of habitats from dry sclerophyll forests (eucalypt forests) and heaths of coastal ranges, through to savannah woodlands, inner grasslands, and arid scrublands and farmland, as well as drier areas that are intermittently flooded. It is more common in open habitat and also farmland and the outskirts of urban areas. It is not found in alpine regions, or on Phillip Island. Because of its mainly rodent diet, it can often be found near houses and farms. Such areas also provide shelter in the form of rubbish and other cover; the snake can use sheets of corrugated iron or buildings as hiding spots, as well as large rocks, burrows, and cracks in the ground.

In December 2023 an eastern brown snake interrupted play at the Brisbane International tennis tournament. Play was paused for 40 minutes, while the animal was removed by a professional snake catcher.

== Behaviour ==
Movement of eastern brown snakes

The eastern brown snake is generally solitary, with females and younger males avoiding adult males. It is active during the day, though it may retire in the heat of hot days to come out again in the late afternoon. It is most active in spring, the males venturing out earlier in the season than females, and is sometimes active on warm winter days. Individuals have been recorded basking on days with temperatures as low as 14 °C (57 °F). Occasional nocturnal activity has been reported. At night, it retires to a crack in the soil or burrow that has been used by a house mouse, or (less commonly) skink, rat, or rabbit. Snakes may use the refuge for a few days before moving on, and may remain above ground during hot summer nights. During winter, they brumate, emerging on warm days to sunbathe. Fieldwork in the Murrumbidgee Irrigation Area found that snakes spent on average 140 days in a burrow over winter, and that most males had entered brumation by the beginning of May (autumn) while females did not begin till mid-May; the males mostly became active in the first week of September (spring), while the females not until the end of the month. The concrete slabs of houses have been used by eastern brown snakes brumating in winter, with 13 recorded coiled up together under a 5 m × 3 m (16 ft × 10 ft) slab of a demolished house between Mount Druitt and Rooty Hill in western Sydney, and another 17 (in groups of one to four) under smaller slabs within 20 m (66 ft) in late autumn 1972. Groups of up to six brumating eastern brown snakes have been recorded from under other slabs in the area. In July 1991 in Melton, six eastern brown snakes were uncovered in a nest in long grass.

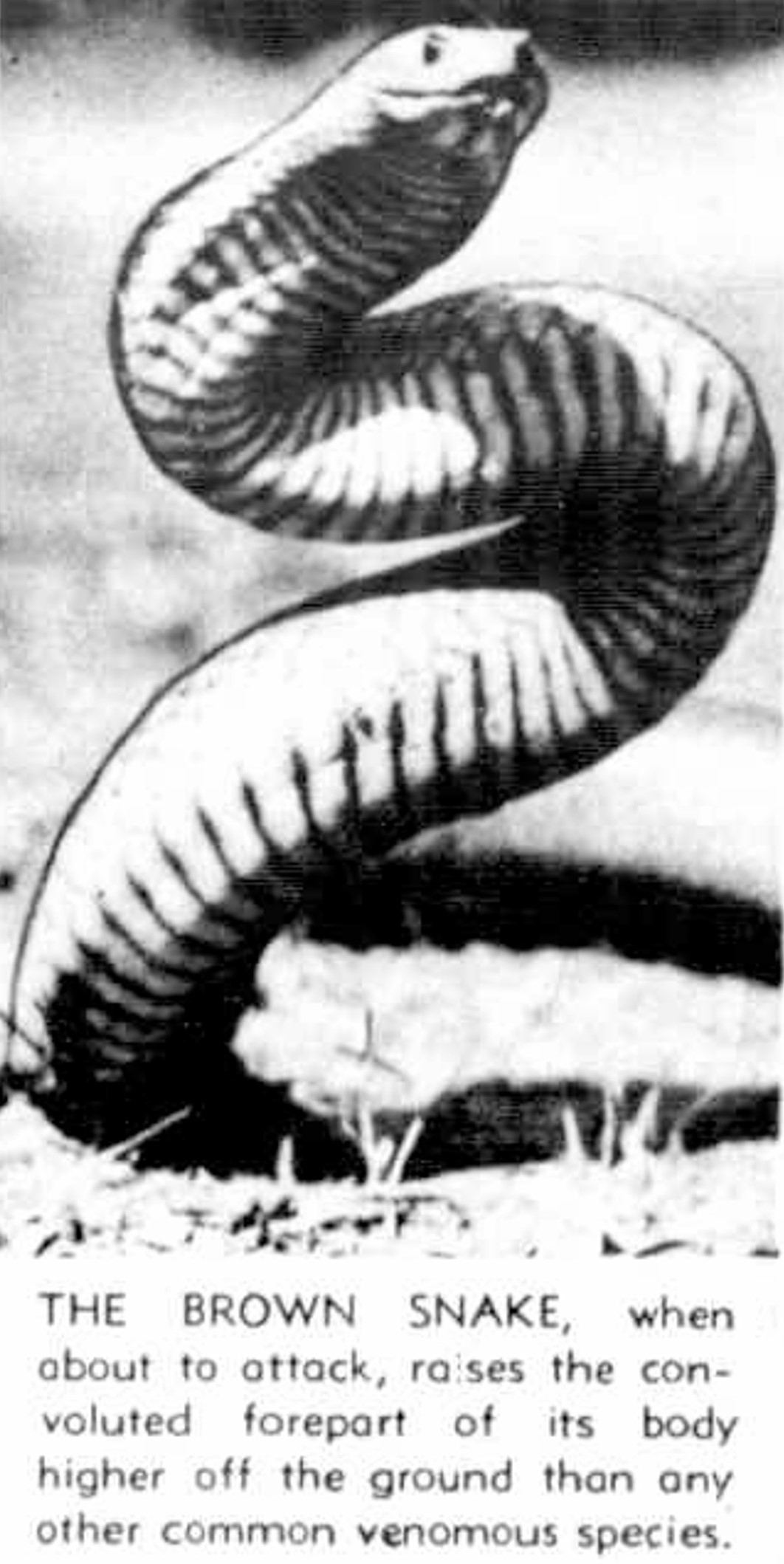
Newspaper clipping from The Australasian, 1940

Eastern brown snakes are very fast-moving; Australian naturalist David Fleay reported that the snake could outpace a person running at full speed. Many people mistake defensive displays for aggression. When confronted, the eastern brown snake reacts with one of two neck displays. During a partial display, the snake raises the front part of its body horizontally just off the ground, flattening its neck and sometimes opening its mouth. In a full display, the snake rises up vertically high off the ground, coiling its neck into an S shape, and opening its mouth. The snake is able to strike more accurately from a full display and more likely to deliver an envenomed bite. Due to the snake's height off the ground in full display, the resulting bites are often on the victim's upper thigh.

A field study in farmland around Leeton that monitored 455 encounters between eastern brown snakes and people found that the snake withdrew around half the time and tried to hide for almost all remaining encounters. In only 12 encounters did the snake advance. They noted that snakes were more likely to notice dark clothing and move away early, reducing the chance of a close encounter. Close encounters were more likely if a person were walking slowly, but a snake was less likely to be aggressive in this situation. Encountering male snakes on windy days with cloud cover heightened risk, as the snake was less likely to see persons until they were close, hence more likely to be startled. Similarly, walking in undisturbed areas on cool days in September and October (early spring) risked running into courting male snakes that would not notice people until close, as they were preoccupied with mating.

=== Reproduction ===
Eastern brown snakes generally mate from early October onwards, during the Southern Hemisphere spring; they are oviparous. Males engage in ritual combat with other males for access to females. The appearance of two males wrestling has been likened to a plaited rope. The most dominant male mates with females in the area. The females produce a clutch of 10 to 35 eggs, with the eggs typically weighing 8.0 g (0.28 oz) each. The eggs are laid in a sheltered spot, such as a burrow or hollow inside a tree stump or rotting log. Multiple females may even use the same location, such as a rabbit warren. Ambient temperature influences the rate at which eggs develop; eggs incubated at 25 °C (77 °F) hatch after 95 days, while those at 30 °C (86 °F) hatch after 36 days. Eastern brown snakes can reach sexual maturity by 31 months of age, and have been reported to live up to 15 years in captivity.

=== Feeding ===
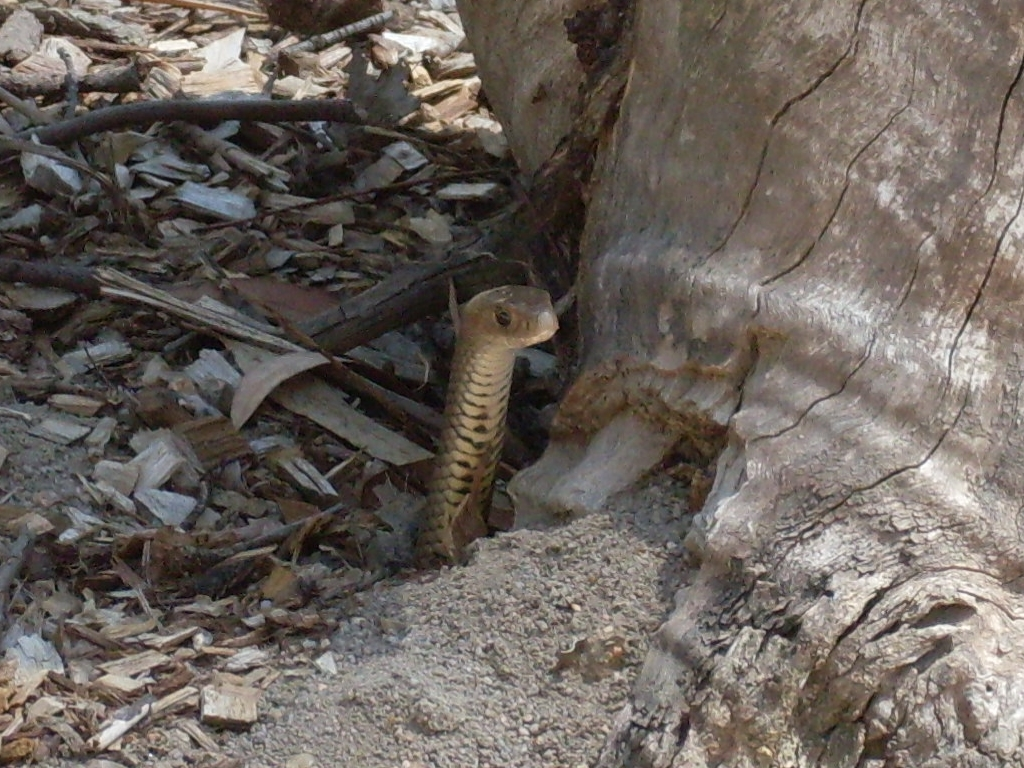
Holding its head up like a periscope looking for prey

The eastern brown snake appears to hunt by sight more than other snakes, and a foraging snake raises its head like a periscope every so often to survey the landscape for prey. It generally finds its prey in their refuges rather than chasing them while they flee. The adult is generally diurnal, while juveniles sometimes hunt at night. The eastern brown snake rarely eats during winter, and females rarely eat while pregnant with eggs. The eastern brown snake has been observed coiling around and constricting prey to immobilise and subdue it, adopting a strategy of envenomating and grappling their prey. Herpetologists Richard Shine and Terry Schwaner proposed that it might be resorting to constriction when attacking skinks, as it might facilitate piercing the skink's thick scales with its small fangs.

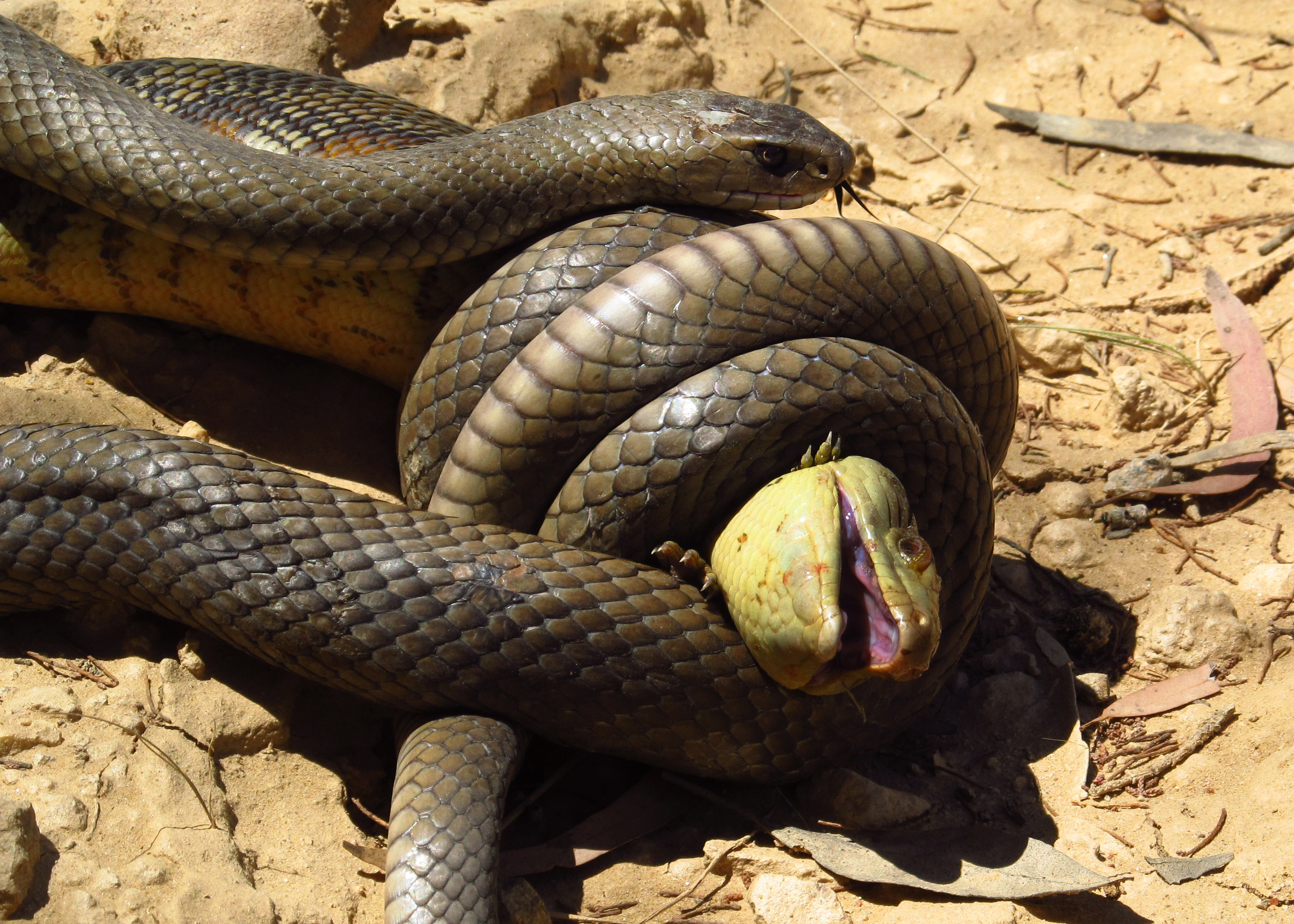
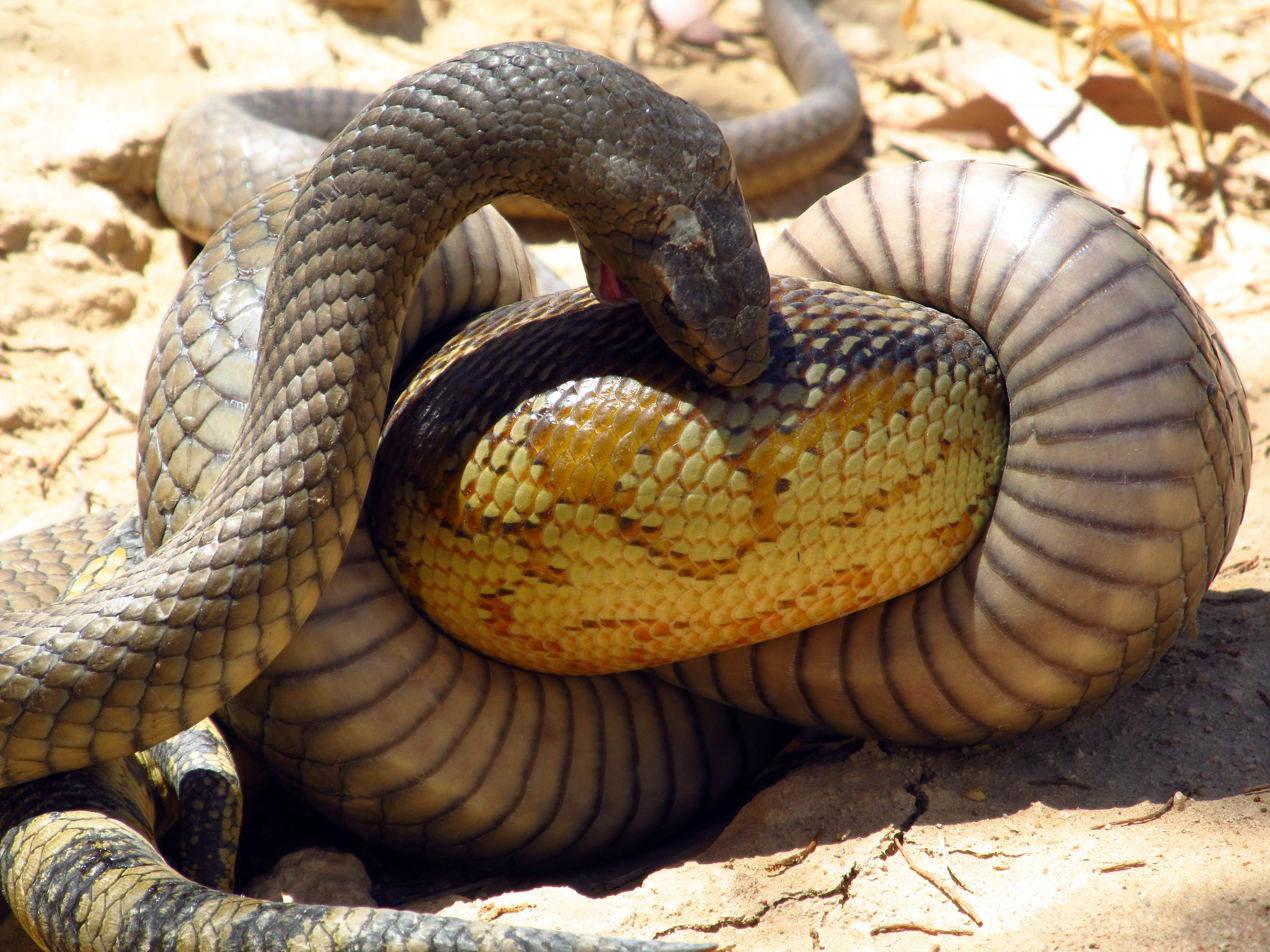
Feeding on a eastern blue-tongued skink

The eastern brown snake's diet is made up almost wholly of vertebrates, with mammals predominating—particularly the introduced house mouse. Mammals as large as feral rabbits have been eaten. Small birds, eggs, and even other snakes are also consumed. Snakes in areas of natural vegetation or paddocks for stock eat a higher proportion of reptiles, while those in crop fields eat more mice. Small lizards such as skinks are more commonly eaten than frogs, as eastern brown snakes generally forage in areas over 100 m (330 ft) distant from water. As snakes grow, they eat proportionately more warm-blooded prey than smaller snakes, which eat more ectothermic animals. Other snakes, such as the common death adder (Acanthophis antarcticus), and carpet python (Morelia spilota), have also been eaten. Cannibalism has also been recorded in young snakes. The bearded dragon is possibly resistant to the effects of the venom. Although the eastern brown snake is susceptible to cane toad toxins, young individuals avoid eating them, which suggests they have learned to avoid them. Some evidence indicates they are immune to their own venom and that of the king brown snake (Pseudechis australis), a potential predator.

== Venom ==
The eastern brown snake is considered the second-most venomous terrestrial snake in the world, behind only the inland taipan (Oxyuranus microlepidotus) of central east Australia. Responsible for more deaths from snakebite in Australia than any other species, it is the most commonly encountered dangerous snake in Adelaide, and is also found in Melbourne, Canberra, Sydney, and Brisbane. As a genus, brown snakes were responsible for 41% of identified snakebite victims in Australia between 2005 and 2015, and for 15 of the 19 deaths during this period. Within the genus, the eastern brown snake is the species most commonly implicated. It is classified as a snake of medical importance by the World Health Organization. (Note: Snakes of medical importance include those with highly dangerous venom resulting in high rates of morbidity and mortality, or those that are common agents in snakebite.)

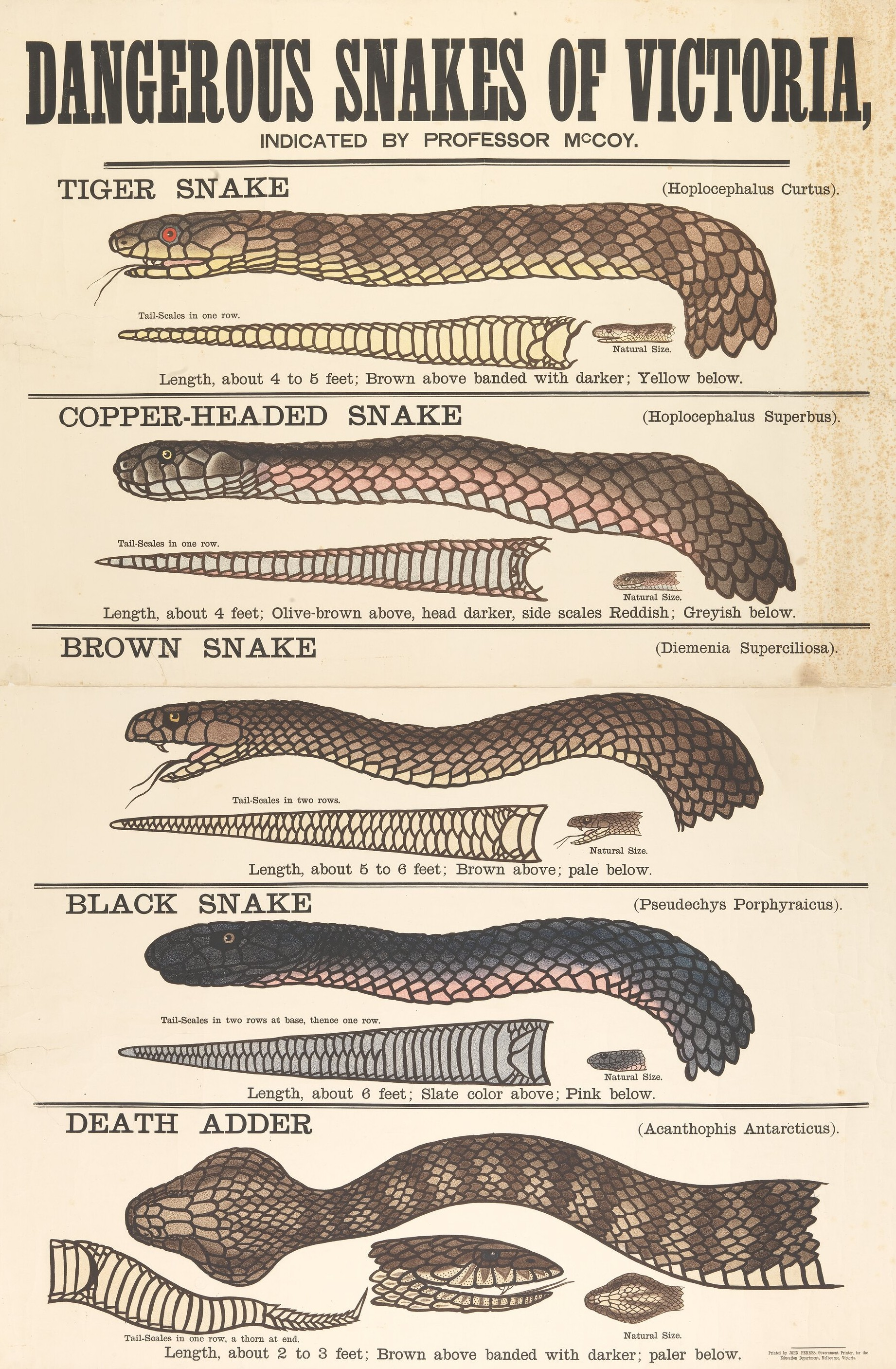
Dangerous snake poster published by Museums Victoria in 1877

Clinically, the venom of the eastern brown snake causes venom-induced consumption coagulopathy; a third of cases develop serious systemic envenoming including hypotension and collapse, thrombotic microangiopathy, severe haemorrhage, and cardiac arrest. Other common systemic symptoms include nausea and vomiting, diaphoresis (sweating), and abdominal pain. Acute kidney injury and seizures can also occur. Onset of symptoms can be rapid, with a headache developing in 15 minutes and clotting abnormalities within 30 minutes; collapse has been recorded as occurring as little as two minutes after being bitten. Death is due to cardiovascular causes such as cardiac arrest or intracranial haemorrhage. Often, little local reaction occurs at the site of the bite. The classical appearance is of two fangmarks around 1 cm apart. Neurotoxicity is rare and generally mild, and myotoxicity (rhabdomyolysis) has not been reported.

The eastern brown snake yields an average of under 5 mg of venom per milking, less than other dangerous Australian snakes. The volume of venom produced is largely dependent on the size of the snake, with larger snakes producing more venom; Queensland eastern brown snakes produced over triple the average amount of venom (11 mg vs 3 mg) than those from South Australia. Worrell reported a milking of 41.4 mg from a relatively large 2.1-m (6.9-ft) specimen. The venom's murine median lethal dose (LD_{50}) has been measured at 41 μg/kg—when using 0.1% bovine serum albumin in saline rather than saline alone—to 53 μg/kg when administered subcutaneously. The lethal dose for humans is just 3 mg. The composition of venom of captive snakes did not differ from that of wild snakes.

The eastern brown snake's venom contains coagulation factors VF5a and VF10, which together form the prothrombinase complex pseutarin-C. This cleaves prothrombin at two sites, converting it to thrombin. Pseutarin-C is a procoagulant in the laboratory, but ultimately an anticoagulant in snakebite victims, as the prothrombin is used up and coagulopathy and spontaneous bleeding set in. Another agent, textilinin, is a Kunitz-like serine protease inhibitor that selectively and reversibly inhibits plasmin. A 2006 study comparing the venom components of eastern brown snakes from Queensland with those from South Australia found that the former had a stronger procoagulant effect and greater antiplasmin activity of textilinin.

The venom also contains pre- and postsynaptic neurotoxins; textilotoxin is a presynaptic neurotoxin, at one stage considered the most potent recovered from any land snake. (Note: This was based on murine LD_{50} results rather than neurotoxic effects on skeletal muscle.) Making up 3% of the crude venom by weight, it is composed of six subunits. Existing in two forms, the venom weighs 83,770 ± 22 daltons (TxI) and about 87,000 daltons (TxII), respectively. Textilotoxin is a type of phospholipase A2, a group of enzymes with diverse effects that are commonly found in snake venoms. At least two further phospholipase A2 enzymes have been found in eastern brown snake venom. Two postsynaptic neurotoxins have been labelled pseudonajatoxin a and pseudonajatoxin b. These are three-finger toxins, a superfamily of proteins found in the venom of many elapid snakes and responsible for neurotoxic effects. Another three-finger toxin was identified in eastern brown snake venom in 2015. Professor Bart Currie coined the term 'brown snake paradox' in 2000 to query why neurotoxic effects were rare or mild despite the presence of textilotoxin in eastern brown snake venom. This is thought to be due to the low concentration of the toxin in the venom, which is injected in only small amounts compared with other snake species.

Analysis of venom in 2016 found—unlike most other snake species—that the venom of juvenile eastern brown snakes differed from that of adults; prothrombinases (found in adults) were absent and the venom did not affect clotting times. Snakes found with a similar profile generally preyed upon dormant animals such as skinks.

The eastern brown snake is the second-most commonly reported species responsible for envenoming of dogs in New South Wales. Dogs and cats are much more likely than people to have neurotoxic symptoms such as weakness or paralysis. One dog bitten suffered a massive haemorrhage of the respiratory tract requiring euthanasia. The venom is uniformly toxic to warm-blooded vertebrates, yet reptile species differ markedly in their susceptibility.

=== Treatment ===
Standard first-aid treatment for any suspected bite from an Australian venomous snake is for a pressure bandage to be applied to the bite site. The victims should move as little as possible, and to be conveyed to a hospital or clinic, where they should be monitored for at least 24 hours. Tetanus toxoid is given, though the mainstay of treatment is the administration of the appropriate antivenom. Brown snake antivenom has been available since 1956. Before this, tiger snake antivenom was used, though it was of negligible benefit in brown snake envenomation. The antivenom had been difficult to research and manufacture as the species was hard to catch, and the amount of venom it produced was generally insufficient for horse immunisation, though these challenges were eventually overcome. Dogs and cats can be treated with a caprylic acid-fractionated, bivalent, whole IgG, equine antivenom.

== Captivity ==
Eastern brown snakes are readily available in Australia via breeding in captivity. They are regarded as challenging to keep, and due to the snakes' speed and toxicity, suitable for only experienced snake keepers.
