= Ingram's brown snake =

Scientific classification
- Kingdom: Animalia
- Phylum: Chordata
- Class: Reptilia
- Order: Squamata
- Suborder: Serpentes
- Family: Elapidae
- Genus: Pseudonaja
- Species: P. ingrami

Binomial name
- Pseudonaja ingrami (Boulenger, 1908)

Synonyms
- Diemenia ingrami Boulenger, 1908; Demansia ingrami — Kinghorn, 1964; Pseudonaja ingrami — Cogger, 1983; Euprepriosoma ingrami — Wells, 2002; Pseudonaja ingrami — Wilson & Swan, 2010

Highly venomous snake native to Australia

Ingram's brown snake (Pseudonaja ingrami) is a species of venomous snake in the family Elapidae. The species is endemic to Australia.

== Taxonomy ==
Belgian-British zoologist George Albert Boulenger described the species in 1908 as Diemenia ingrami, from a specimen collected on Alexandria Station in the Northern Territory. The specific name, ingrami, is in honour of Collingwood Ingram, who was an English ornithologist and horticulturist. The brown snakes were moved to the genus Pseudonaja by Australian naturalist Eric Worrell in the early 1960s on the basis of skull morphology, and reinforced by American herpetologist Samuel Booker McDowell in 1967 on the basis of the muscles of the venom glands. This classification has been followed by subsequent authors. Genetic analysis indicates that Ingram's brown snake is diverged from the ancestor of all other brown snakes except the more basal ringed brown snake (P. modesta) and speckled brown snake (P. guttata).

== Description ==
Ingram's brown snake grows to 1.76 m (5 ft 9 in) in total length (including tail). It has a grey-brown to dark brown head and nape, black-brown to golden brown upper parts. It has 17 rows of dorsal scales at midbody, 190 to 220 ventral scales, 55 to 70 divided subcaudal scales (occasionally some of the anterior ones are undivided), and a divided anal scale.

== Distribution and habitat ==
P. ingrami is native to a broad swathe of inland Australia, from northwestern Queensland to northeastern Western Australia. It lives in tussock grasslands on black soil, retreating into earth crevices.

== Feeding ==
Ingram's brown snake eats small birds and mammals.

== Reproduction ==
P. ingrami is oviparous, with clutches ranging between 12 and 18 eggs.
