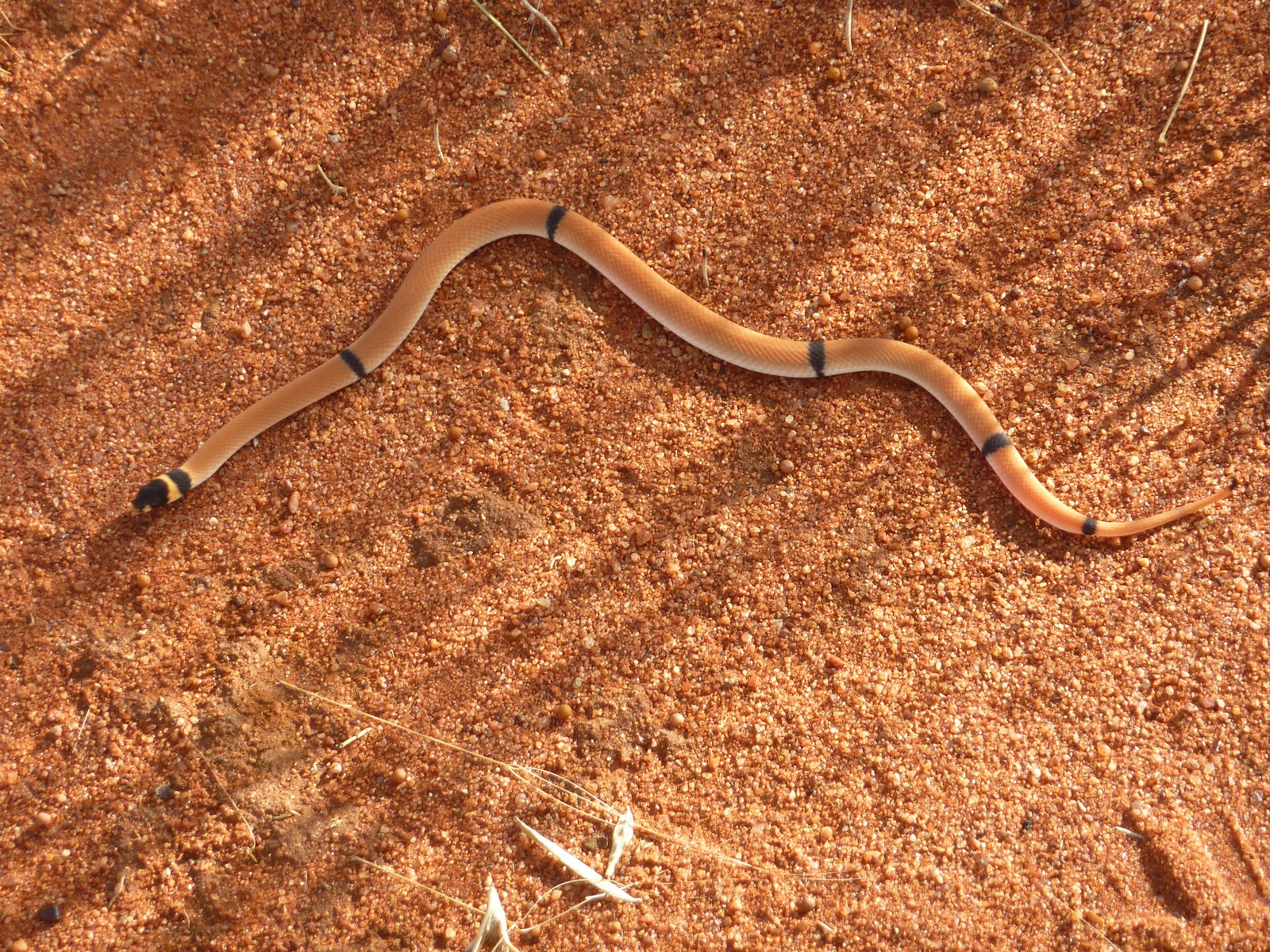
- Ringed brown snake (P. modesta) in Northern Territory, Australia

Scientific classification
- Kingdom: Animalia
- Phylum: Chordata
- Class: Reptilia
- Order: Squamata
- Suborder: Serpentes
- Family: Elapidae
- Subfamily: Hydrophiinae
- Genus: Pseudonaja; Günther, 1858

= Pseudonaja =

Genus of snakes

Pseudonaja is a genus of highly venomous elapid snakes native to Australia. Species of this genus are known commonly as brown snakes and are considered to be some of the most dangerous snakes in the world; even young snakes are capable of delivering a fatal envenomation to a human.

Despite its common name, the king brown snake (Pseudechis australis) is not a brown snake, but a member of the genus Pseudechis, commonly known as black snakes.

== Species ==
These species and subspecies are recognized:

- Pseudonaja affinis Günther, 1872 — dugite or spotted brown snake
  - P. a. affinis Günther, 1872 — coastal mainland Western Australia
  - P. a. exilis Storr, 1989 — mainland Western Australia and Rottnest Island
  - P. a. tanneri (Worrell, 1961) — mainland Western Australia, Boxer Island, and other islands
- Pseudonaja aspidorhyncha (F. McCoy, 1879) strap-snouted brown snake — inland eastern Australia
- Pseudonaja guttata (Parker, 1926) — speckled brown snake or spotted brown snake — Northern Territory, Queensland, and South Australia
- Pseudonaja inframacula (Waite, 1925) — peninsula brown snake — South Australia, Western Australia, Eyre Peninsula
- Pseudonaja ingrami (Boulenger, 1908) — Ingram's brown snake — Northern Territory, Queensland, and Western Australia
- Pseudonaja mengdeni Wells & Wellington, 1985 — gwardar or western brown snake — New South Wales, Northern Territory, Queensland, South Australia, Victoria, and Western Australia
- Pseudonaja modesta (Günther, 1872) — ringed brown snake — New South Wales, Northern Territory, Queensland, South Australia, and Western Australia
- Pseudonaja nuchalis Günther, 1858 — northern brown snake — Northern Territory, Queensland
- Pseudonaja textilis (A.M.C. Duméril, Bibron & A.H.A. Duméril, 1854) — eastern brown snake — New South Wales, Northern Territory, Queensland, South Australia, Victoria, south-eastern West Papua, and both south-eastern (Central Province) and north-eastern (Oro and Milne Bay Provinces) Papua New Guinea

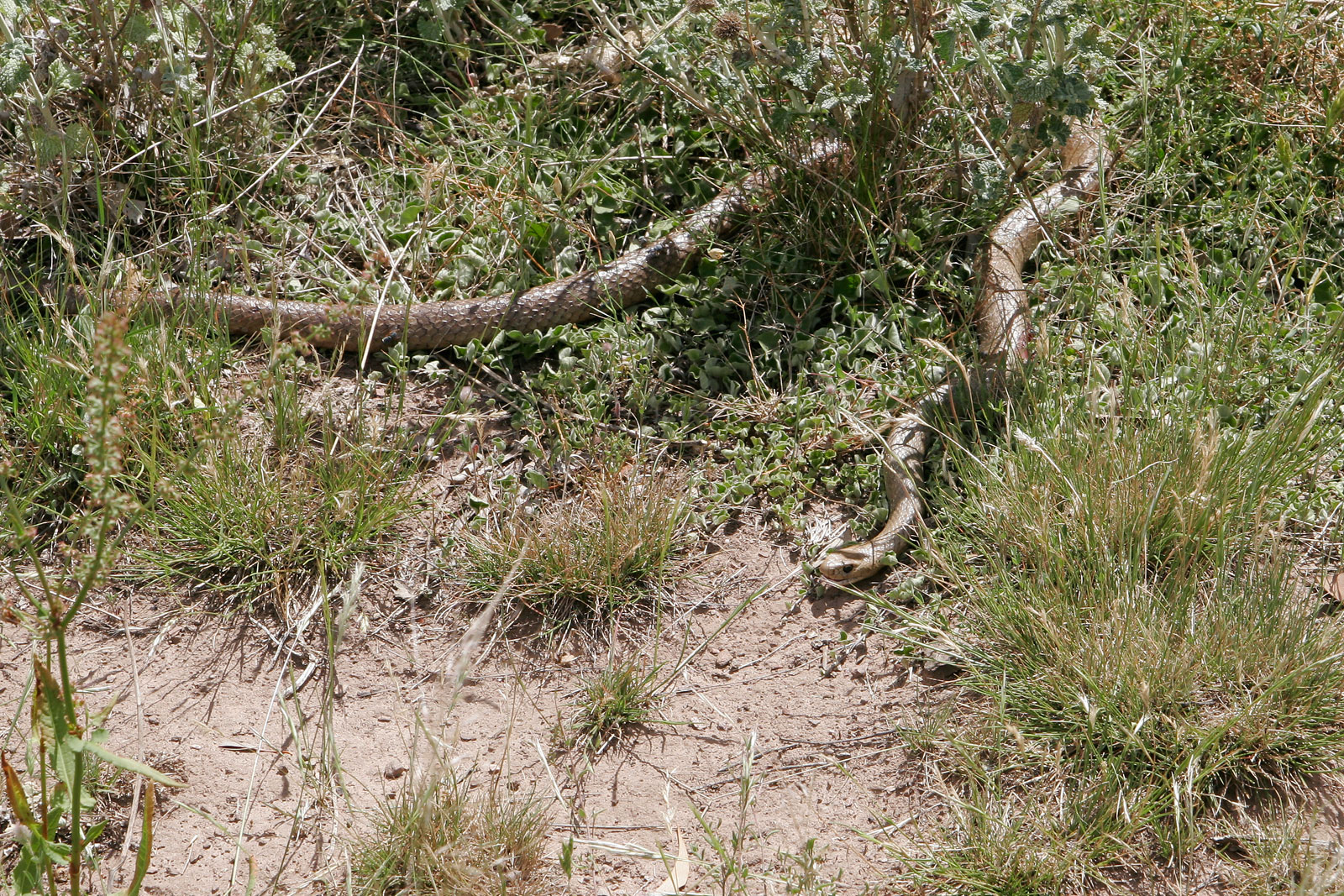
A dugite in Joondalup, Western Australia

N.B: A binomial authority in parentheses indicates that the species was originally described in a genus other than Pseudonaja. Similarly, a trinomial authority in parentheses indicates that the subspecies was originally described in a genus other than Pseudonaja.

== Venom ==
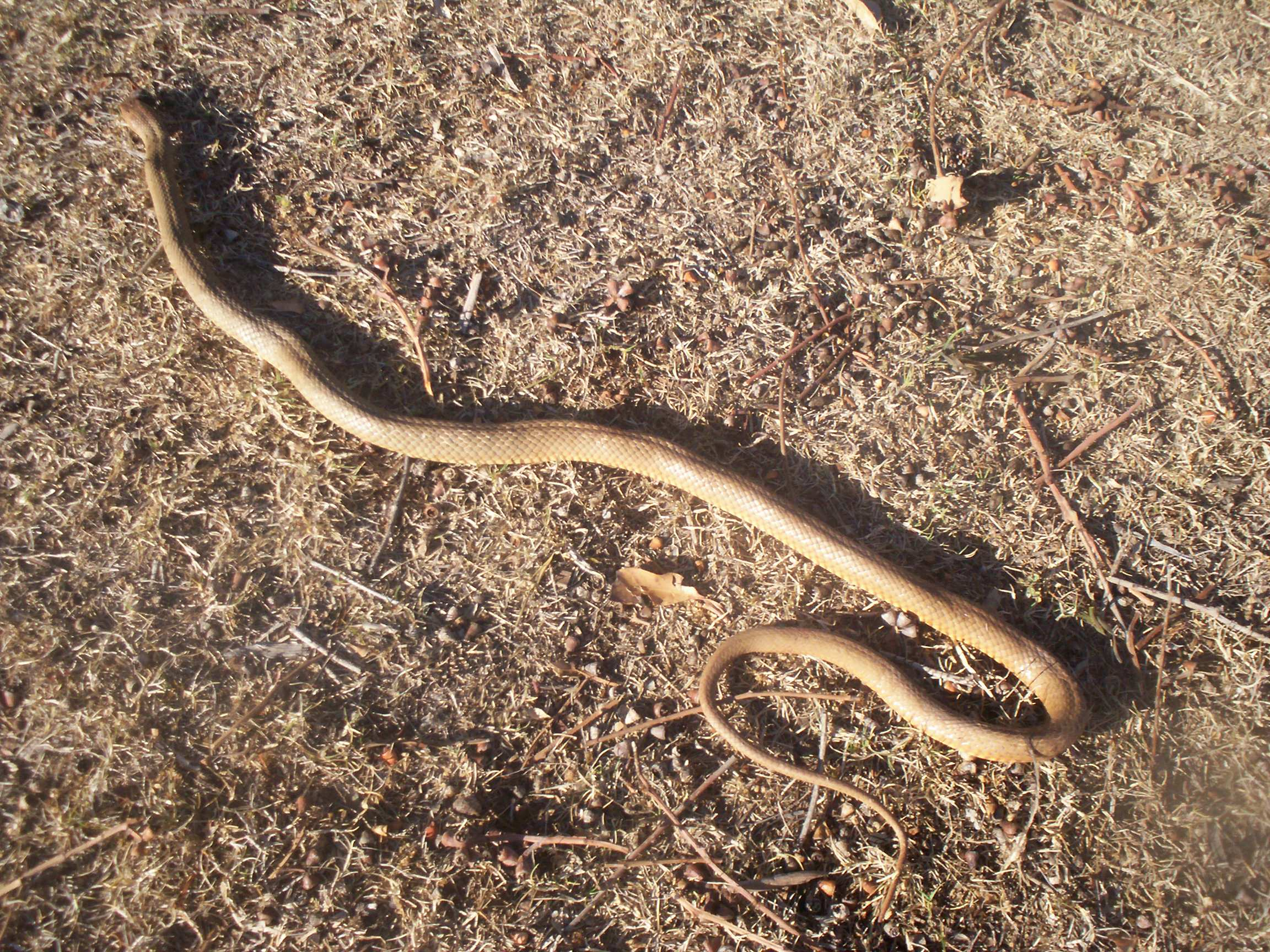
An eastern brown snake

Brown snakes accounted for 41% of identified snakebite victims in Australia between 2005 and 2015, with 15 deaths recorded from 296 confirmed envenomations—far more than any other type of snake. Review of snakebite-related deaths in the National Coronial Information System from January 2000 to December 2016 revealed brown snakes were responsible for 23 of 35 deaths.

Brown snakes are easily alarmed and may bite if approached closely, handled, or threatened. Sudden, early collapse is often a symptom of envenomation by them. A prominent effect of envenomation is venom-induced consumption coagulopathy, which can lead to death. Renal damage may also rarely occur.

Other clinical signs include abdominal pain, breathing and swallowing difficulty, convulsions, ptosis, hemolysis, and hypotension from depression of myocardial contractility. Notably, brown snake envenomation does not result in rhabdomyolysis.

The eastern brown snake (Pseudonaja textilis) is the most toxic member of the genus and is considered by some to be the second-most venomous land snake in the world, after the inland taipan (which is also found in Australia). The western brown snake is the 10th-most venomous snake in the world.

Brown snakes can easily harm pet animals and livestock.

The venom fangs of snakes of the genus Pseudonaja are very short, and the average yield of venom per bite is relatively low—for P. textilis, P. nuchalis, and P. affinis, about 4.0 to 6.5 mg dry weight of venom. Therefore, most of the bites end up without serious medical consequences. Despite its toxicity, the smallest Pseudonaja, P. modesta, can even be considered harmless. Bites by the bigger species of Pseudonaja, especially P. textilis and P. nuchalis, are known for causing serious toxicosis and fatalities.
