= Barkly Tableland =

Coordinates: 19°38′50″S 134°11′25″E

- Region
- Mitchell grass plains representing the Barkly Tableland proper
- Country: Australia
- State: Northern Territory

Government
  - Territory electorate: Barkly
  - Federal division: Lingiari

Area
  - Total: 320,000 km^{2} (120,000 sq mi)

Population
  - Total: 6,330 (2007)
  - Density: 0.0198/km^{2} (0.0512/sq mi)
Regions around Barkly Tableland
Katherine Region	Gulf Country	Gulf Country
The Tanami	Barkly Tableland	Mount Isa Inlier
The Sandover	Channel Country	Mitchell Grass Downs

The Barkly Tableland is a region in the Central East of the Northern Territory, extending into Western Queensland. The region was named after Sir Henry Barkly. The epithet "Tableland" is inaccurate, since the region is neither elevated relative to adjacent landforms, nor are the boundaries marked by a distinct change in elevation.

The Barkly Tableland is a poorly defined region. The name Barkly Tableland properly applies only to the areas of largely treeless, cracking-clay soils supporting grasslands dominated by Mitchell grass (Astrebla spp.).

A variety of terms, such as "Barkly Tablelands Region" and "Barkly Region", have come into common use for referring to various circumscriptions of the region. All include portions of the Barkly Tablelands proper, along with varying adjoining landforms and vegetation types.

Varying definitions of the Barkly regions encompass:

- An area from Dunmarra south to Barrow Creek, and from the Tanami Desert to the Queensland border.
- The Barkly Tableland proper, the associated Gulf Country, the upper Georgina River basin, and portions of the inland desert country.
- From the McArthur River in the north, parallel approximately 160 km (approximately 100 miles) inland from the west coast of the Gulf of Carpentaria, to the Queensland border in the east.
- The Barkly Shire local government area.
- The Barkly locality in Queensland.
- Various regions defined by Northern Territory and Australian Commonwealth government departments.

In addition, there exists a Barkly Tablelands IBRA subregion, which conforms approximately with parts of the Barkly Tablelands proper.

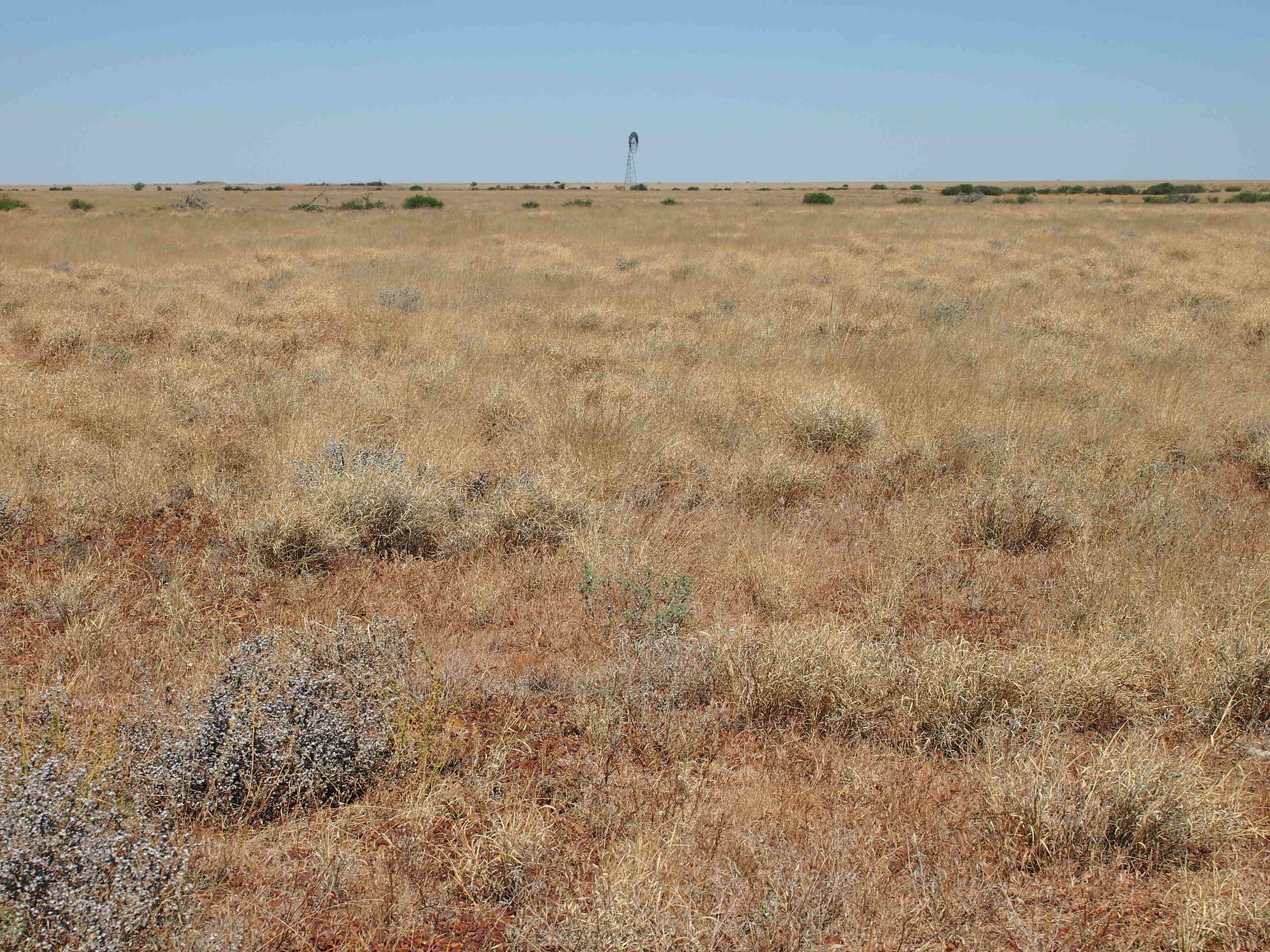
Treeless Mitchell Grass Downs of the Barkly Tableland.

== History ==
Maps of different circumscriptions of the Barkly Tableland Regions
Microscopic struc

William Landsborough was the first non-Indigenous Australian person to explore the tableland, and named it after Sir Henry Barkly, then governor of Victoria.

In 1877 the overlander, Nathaniel Buchanan and Sam Croker crossed the Barkly Tableland and rode on to the Overland Telegraph Line opening new land for settlement. It was not until the introduction of generous leasing arrangements on the Barkly in the late 1870s that the region became more settled.

In 1883, Harry Readford, one of the inspirations for the literary character Captain Starlight, drove a mob of cattle to the Barkly and subsequently established Brunette Downs (then called Corella Creek), with outstations at Anthony Lagoon and Cresswell Creek, for Macdonald, Smith and Co. In 1884, 2,500 cattle were driven to Brunette Downs and in 1885, Readford brought in 1,200 mixed cattle from Burketown.

== Geography ==
Map of the Barly Tableland IBRA sub-region superimposed on a hillshade model, illustrating that the "tableland" is no higher than the surrounding landforms.

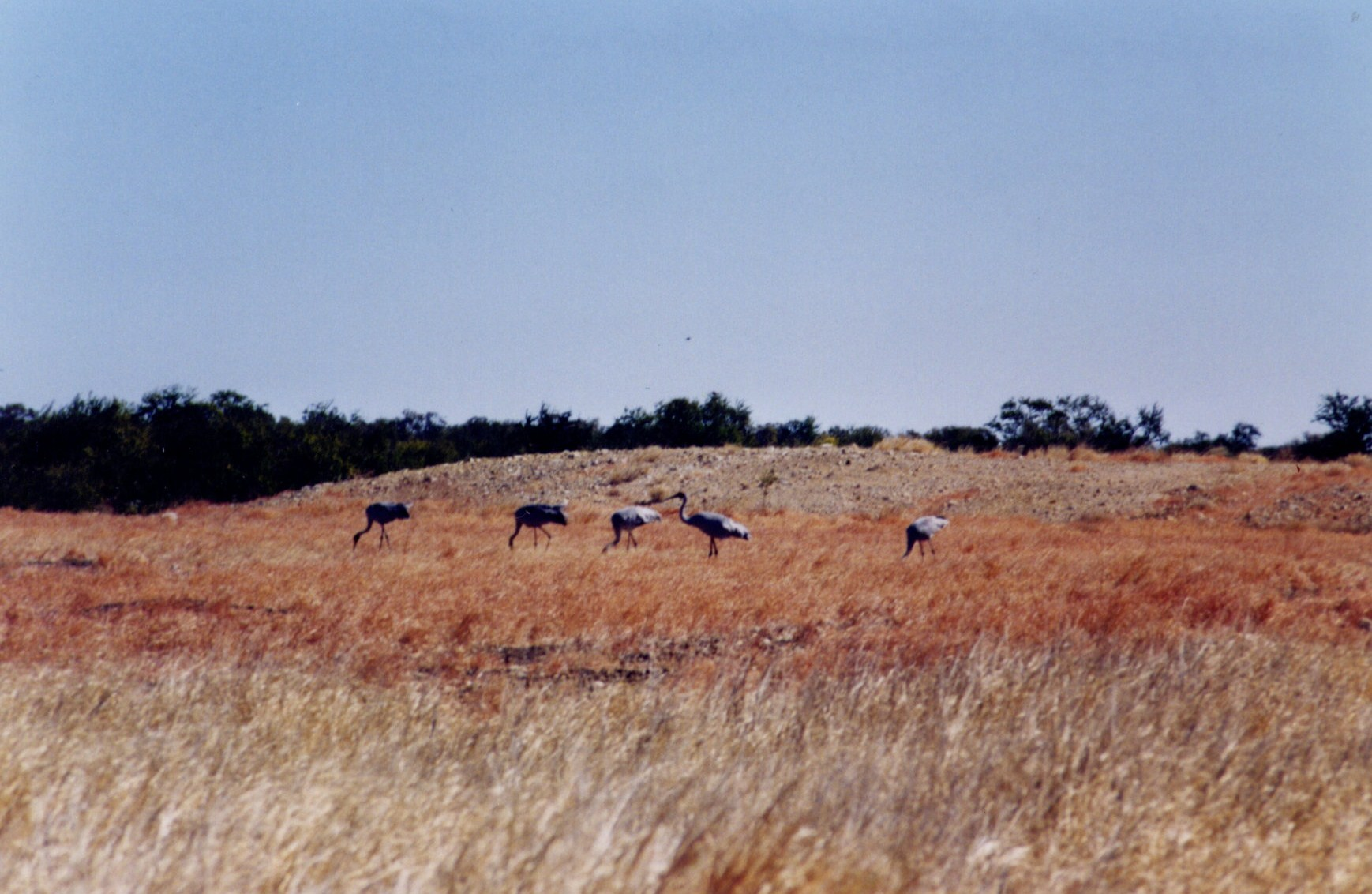
Brolgas, Brunette Downs station, Barkly Tableland, NT

Black soil plains cover much of the Barkly Tableland. Rainfall in this inland area is low (350mm per year) and subject to extreme seasonal fluctuations with rains occurring from November to March during the hot (up to 40 °C) summer. Winters are cool and frost may occur, especially in the southern section of the plain in Queensland.

The Barkly Tableland is a distinct physiographic province of the larger West Australian Shield division. It includes the Mueller Plateau and Sandover-Pituri Platform physiographic sections between the desert uplands in the west and Mount Isa, Queensland in the east. The Tableland drains into the Gulf of Carpentaria via the Flinders River while the southwestern plains drain into Lake Eyre via the Diamantina River or into the Simpson Desert via the Georgina River which has its source on the Tableland. Waterways of the Tableland itself are small as most water drains into the porous limestone, sometimes forming salt lakes. Tarrabool Lake, the largest wooded swamp in tropical Australia, is located in the west of the Tablelands. Other important water sources on the downs are the artesian springs.

Some of the very large cattle stations located on the Tableland include Alexandria Station, Alroy Downs, Anthony Lagoon, Austral Downs, Avon Downs, Banka Banka, Brunette Downs, Creswell Downs, Eva Downs, Helen Springs, Newcastle Waters and Lake Nash Station.

== Ecology ==
The dominant flora of the Tableland is semi-arid savanna of Mitchell grass. The grasslands are mostly used for cattle grazing and are home to some threatened species of plants and animals.

=== Flora ===
Mitchell grass is hardy with long roots so is well adapted to dry soils and periods of drought. The grasslands support other distinctive plants alongside the grasses but there are no areas of thick woodland, only acacia trees scattered across the plain, and red river gum along watercourses.

=== Fauna ===
The habitat of the Mitchell Grass Downs is mostly a uniform cover of grassland and therefore does not support a great variety of wildlife. The few mammals include the brushtail possum (Trichosurus vulpecula) and the Alexandria false antechinus (Pseudantechinus mimulus), a small carnivorous marsupial found only in a number of small, isolated localities in northern Australia, including Alexandria Station on the Barkly Tableland.

There are healthy populations of grassland birds, such as the flock bronzewing. The seasonal wetlands of the downs are important habitats, particularly as breeding grounds for waterbirds. These include the Lake Woods and Lake Buchanan.

There are also many snakes and other reptiles and amphibians adapted to the clay soils that crack in the long dry season and turn to mud after the rains. These include burrowing frogs that emerge to breed in the mud, and the long-haired rat which erupts in huge numbers after the monsoon and spreads across the grasslands. Endemic reptiles of the downs include the dwarf dtella gecko (Gehyra minuta), some species of Ctenotus and Lerista skinks, an agamid lizard (Pogona henrylawsoni), and a monitor lizard (Spencer's goanna). The snakes include the Elapidae; speckled brown snake (Pseudonaja guttata), Ingram's brown snake (Pseudonaja ingrami), and Collett's snake, all of which are venomous. Insects include a number of endemic species of ant, and grasshoppers such as Ecphantus quadrilobus.

=== Threats and preservation ===
Some of the grassland is protected, but most is pasture. Although largely unspoilt, it is vulnerable to overgrazing, particularly areas of Queensland bluebush (Chenopodium auricomum). The downs are home to a number of endangered species and localised habitats that are threatened.

Protected areas that contain Mitchell grassland include Connells Lagoon Conservation Reserve in the Northern Territory.
