= Pseudonajatoxin b =

Toxin found in the venom of the eastern brown snake

Pseudonajatoxin b, or Pt-b, is a highly potent and lethal long-chain α-neurotoxin found in the venom of the eastern brown snake (Pseudonaja textilis). While the pharmacodynamics of pseudonajatoxin b are currently undocumented, α-neurotoxins are known to cause neuromuscular paralysis by blocking cholinergic neurotransmission.

== Source ==
Pseudonajatoxin b is present in the venom of the highly lethal eastern brown snake, Pseudonaja textilis, which is the leading cause of snakebites in Australia. The concentration of pseudonajatoxin b in venom of South Australian specimens is up to a hundred times higher than in those from Queensland.

== Chemistry ==
=== Structure and homology ===
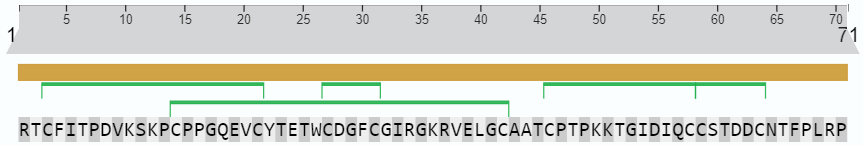
Amino acid sequence of pseudonajatoxin b. Disulfide bonds depicted in green. Retrieved from UniProt database.

Pseudonajatoxin b is composed of a single polypeptide chain of 71 amino acids and features five disulphide bridges. It exhibits 61-73% sequence homology with other long neurotoxins. Distinctive characteristics of pseudonajatoxin b include a high occurrence of proline residues, particularly at positions 49 and 54, where valines are usually present. Moreover, it contains an additional amino acid in the loop between Cys-46 and Cys-58.

=== Protein family ===
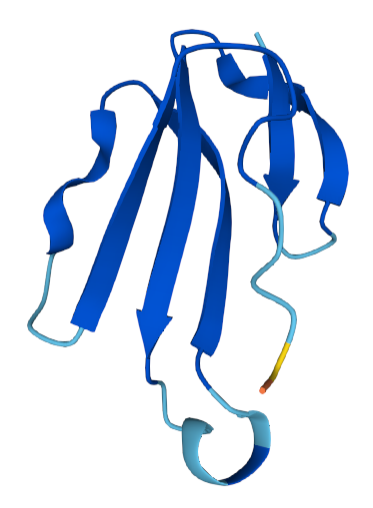
AlphaFold structure model of Pseudonajatoxin b. Colors indicate the model confidence, ranging from very high (dark blue) to very low (orange). Retrieved from UniProt database.

Pseudonajatoxin b is a type of three-finger toxin, which are characterized by a structure of three loops that emerge from a hydrophobic core. Specifically, it falls within the long-chain subfamily of the α-neurotoxin group.

== Target and mechanism of action ==
Although the pharmacodynamics of pseudonajatoxin b have not been documented, α-neurotoxins generally exhibit some common traits.

Long-chain α-neurotoxins have been shown to bind with high affinity to both muscular and neuronal nicotinic acetylcholine receptors. These receptors serve as the primary mediator of muscle contraction in response to nerve impulses. Additionally, they are present in the central nervous system, where they play an important role in autonomic processes, including the regulation of heart rate and respiration.

By acting as competitive antagonists to acetylcholine, α-neurotoxins block acetylcholine from binding and subsequently prevent the activation of ion channels. This disruption in neurotransmission effectively leads to neuromuscular paralysis. Importantly, since the activation of nicotinic acetylcholine receptors requires the binding of two acetylcholine molecules, the blockage of just one binding site by an α-neurotoxin is sufficient to prevent channel opening. Furthermore, long-chain α-neurotoxins typically bind tightly and irreversibly to nicotinic receptors, resulting in permanent channel inactivation once they are bound.

== Toxicity and treatment ==
Pseudonajatoxin b is a highly potent toxin, with a median lethal dose (LD_{50}) of 15 pg/kg in mice. Although the specific lethal mechanisms of pseudonajatoxin b remain unknown, it is well established that both α-neurotoxins and the venom of P. textilis induce paralysis, leading to death through asphyxiation.

Currently, no treatment specific for pseudonajatoxin b has been documented. However, envenomation from Pseudonaja textilis can be treated with snake antivenom made from antibodies, specifically horse immuno-globulins. Despite this, studies have shown that brown snake antivenom has low efficacy against Pseudonaja textilis venom.
