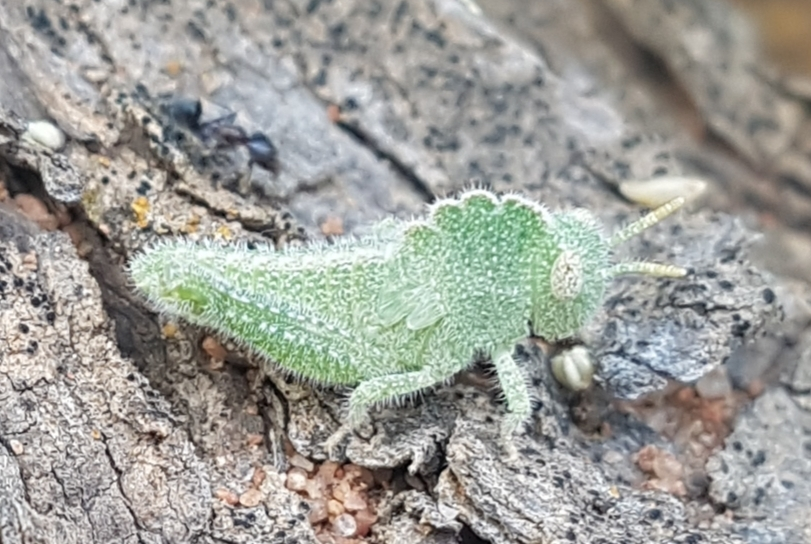

Scientific classification
- Kingdom: Animalia
- Phylum: Arthropoda
- Clade: Pancrustacea
- Class: Insecta
- Order: Orthoptera
- Suborder: Caelifera
- Family: Acrididae
- Genus: Ecphantus
- Species: E. quadrilobus

Binomial name
- Ecphantus quadrilobus Stål, 1878

= Ecphantus quadrilobus =

Species of grasshoppers

Ecphantus quadrilobus, also known as the crested tooth-grinder, is a genus of short-horned grasshopper in the family Acrididae. It is found mostly in Top End Australian savannas, especially in more arid areas around the Barkly Tablelands. When handled it makes a defensive whining sound by rubbing the mandibles together. E. quadrilobus is particularly found on solanaceous plants.
