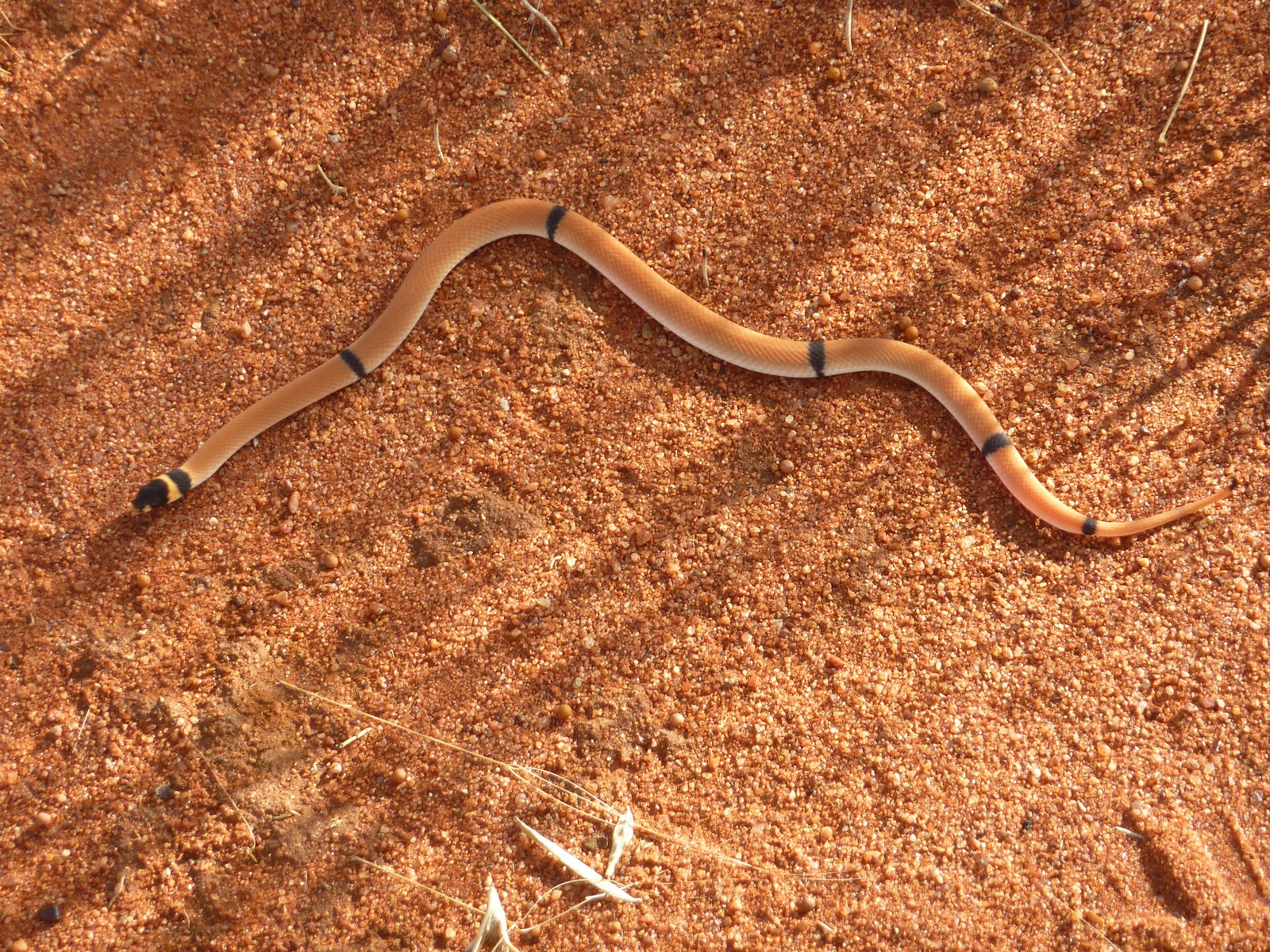
- P. modesta in Northern Territory, Australia

Conservation status
- Least Concern (IUCN 3.1)

Scientific classification
- Kingdom: Animalia
- Phylum: Chordata
- Class: Reptilia
- Order: Squamata
- Suborder: Serpentes
- Family: Elapidae
- Genus: Pseudonaja
- Species: P. modesta

Binomial name
- Pseudonaja modesta Günther, 1872

Synonyms
- Cacophis modesta Günther; Furina ramsayi Macleay, 1885; Brachysoma sutherlandi De Vis, 1884

= Ringed brown snake =

Highly venomous snake native to Australia

The ringed brown snake (Pseudonaja modesta) is a species of venomous elapid snake native to a broad swathe of inland Australia, from western New South Wales and Queensland to Western Australia.

Albert Günther described it as Cacophis modesta in 1872, from specimens collected in northwestern Australia. The specific name modesta is the Latin adjective "unassuming", "orderly", or "well-behaved", regarded as apt by toxicologist Struan Sutherland, as the snake generally does not bite people. Meanwhile, Charles Walter De Vis described Brachysoma sutherlandi from Carl Creek, Norman River in northwestern Queensland in 1884, and William Macleay described Furina ramsayi, naming it after Edward Pierson Ramsay, in 1885 from a collection from Milparinka in northwestern New South Wales. All three are the same species.

Reaching around 50 cm (20 in) in length, the ringed brown snake has grey-brown to red-brown upperparts with a black head and neck split by a cream band, as well as four to seven black bands with cream margins at regular intervals down the length of its body. Its underparts are cream to yellow splotched with orange. The upper dark bands may fade markedly with age. Its colour and markings, particularly its black head and neck band, resemble the juvenile eastern brown snake.

The ringed brown snake is found in arid regions across inland Australia (except Victoria). It lives in arid shrubland or grassland, where it hides in spinifex or under fallen timber.

A girl bitten by this species in 1987 suffered mild systemic symptoms. No coagulopathy was recorded.
