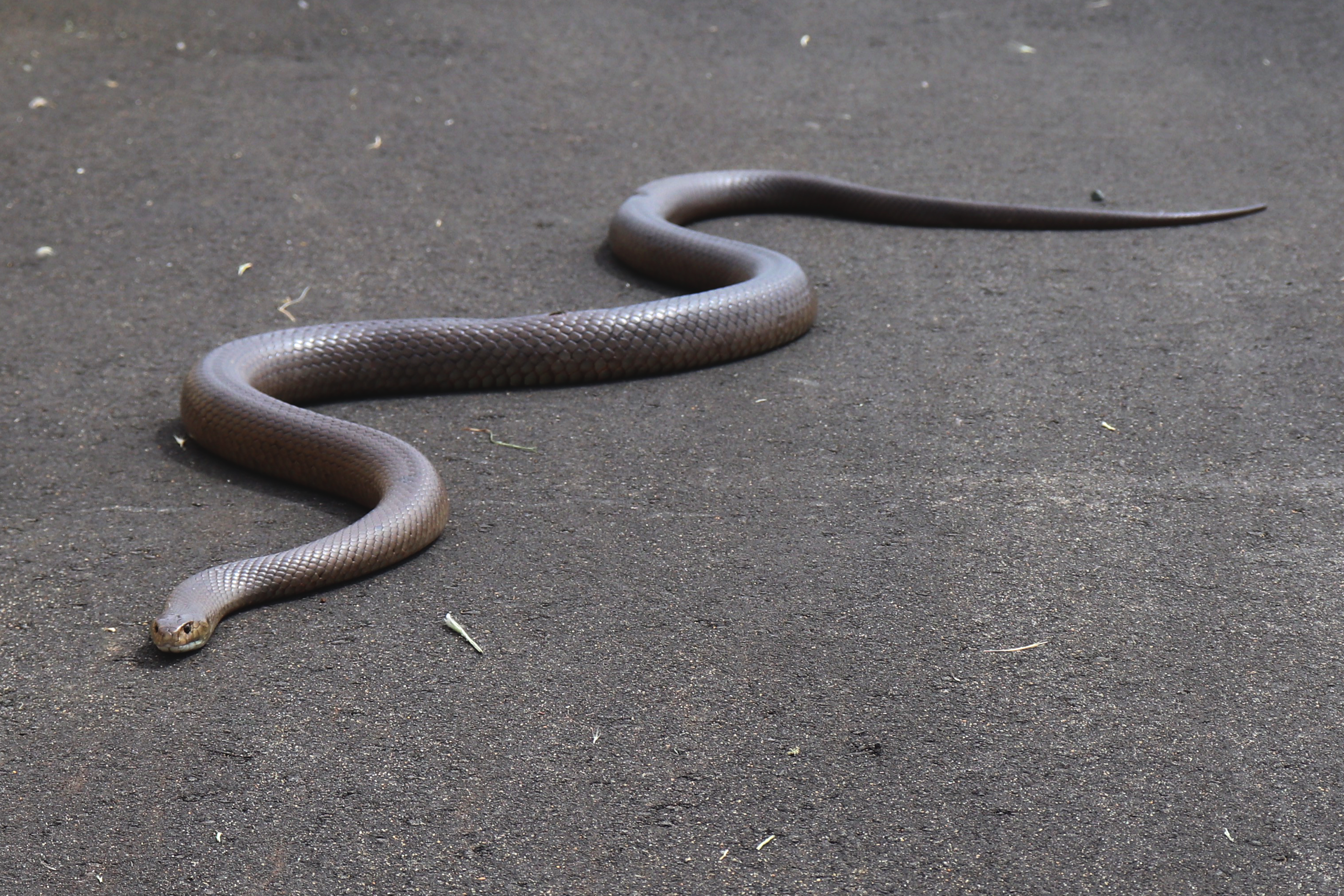
- A dugite on a walking path

Conservation status
- Least Concern (IUCN 3.1)

Scientific classification
- Kingdom: Animalia
- Phylum: Chordata
- Class: Reptilia
- Order: Squamata
- Suborder: Serpentes
- Family: Elapidae
- Genus: Pseudonaja
- Species: P. affinis

Binomial name
- Pseudonaja affinis Günther, 1872

Subspecies
- Pseudonaja affinis affinis Günther, 1872; Pseudonaja affinis exilis Storr, 1989; Pseudonaja affinis tanneri (Worrell, 1961)

= Dugite =

Highly venomous snake endemic to Western Australia

The dugite (/ˈdjuːɡaɪt/; Pseudonaja affinis) is a species of highly venomous, potentially lethal snake endemic to Western Australia, a member of the family Elapidae.

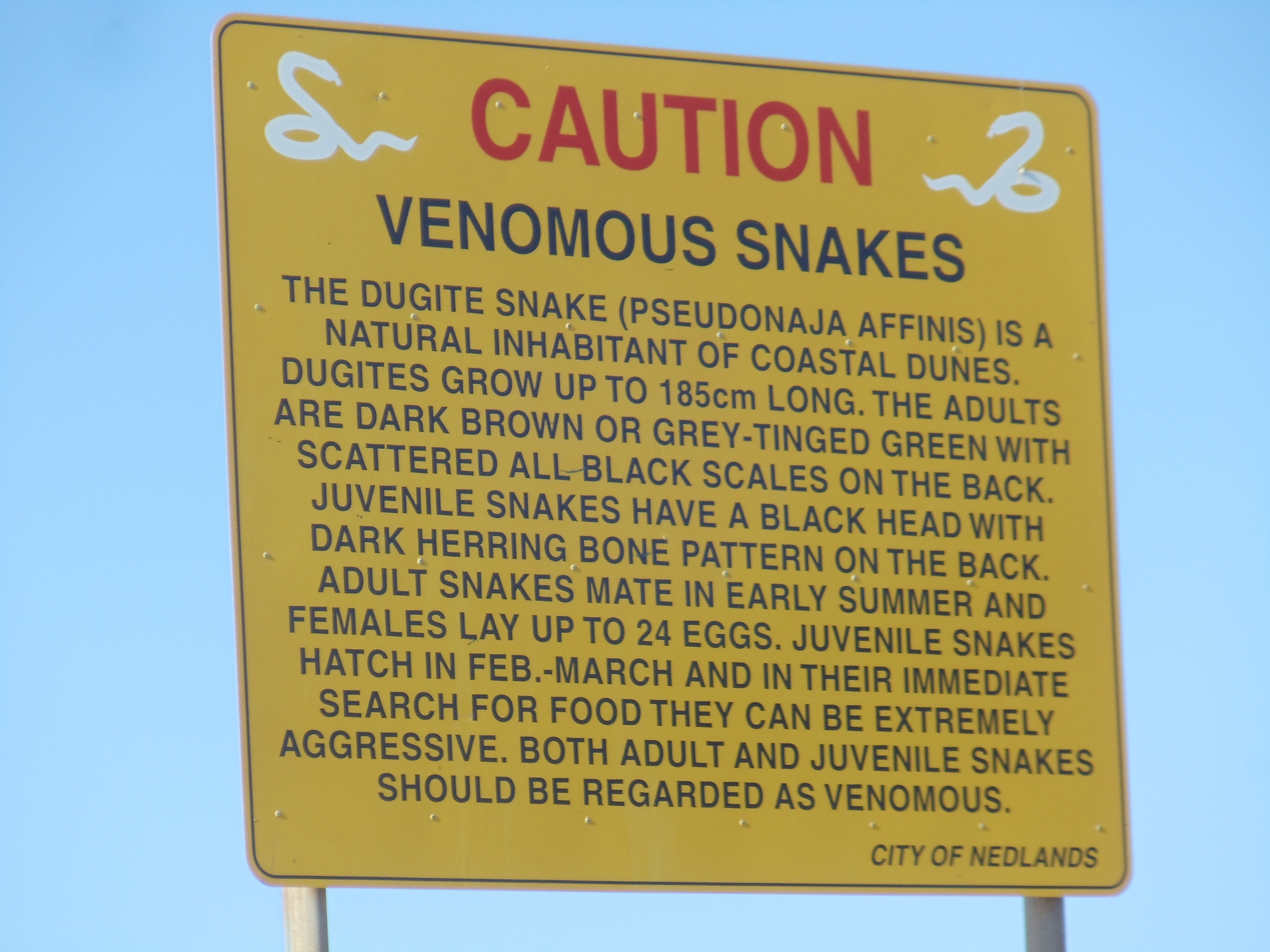
Caution sign for dugite snakes in the coastal dunes near Swanbourne Beach in Swanbourne, Western Australia.

The word dugite is an anglicisation of names for the snake in some dialects of the Nyungar language, including toogitj, dukayj and dukitj. However, another, probably cognate name, dobitj, has become the common name for dugites in Nyungar (a potential source of confusion, as dobitj is also used in some dialects to refer to other kinds of venomous snakes).

== Description ==
The dugite is a venomous snake, considered dangerous. It is coloured grey, green, or brown. The colours vary widely between individuals and are an unreliable means of identifying the species. Black scales can be scattered over the body; their scales are relatively large with a semi-glossy appearance. The most distinguishing characteristic is the head that can be rather small and indistinct from the neck. A dugite's body is long and slender in build and can grow up to 2 metres (6 ft 7 in) in total length (including tail), but the typical size is roughly 1.5 metres (4 ft 11 in).

== Distribution and habitat ==
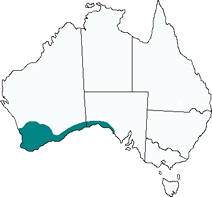
Dugite distribution within Australia

P. affinis is found in southern parts of Western Australia and in remote coastal parts of western South Australia.

The dugite occupies a wide variety of habitats ranging from coastal dunes and heathlands to shrub lands and woodlands. It also appears to thrive in heavily degraded habitats such as golf courses, industrial areas, and open agricultural farmlands.

The dugite has increased in population since the opening up of its natural habitats and introduction of the house mouse due to the mouse being a main food source for it. In the Perth metropolitan area, the dugite is one of the most common snakes found next to buildings. In areas of human population, the snake will take temporary shelter under concrete slabs, fibro sheeting, roofing tin, and such, although in more natural habitats, it will shelter under rocks and in abandoned termite mounds. It also burrows during the winter.

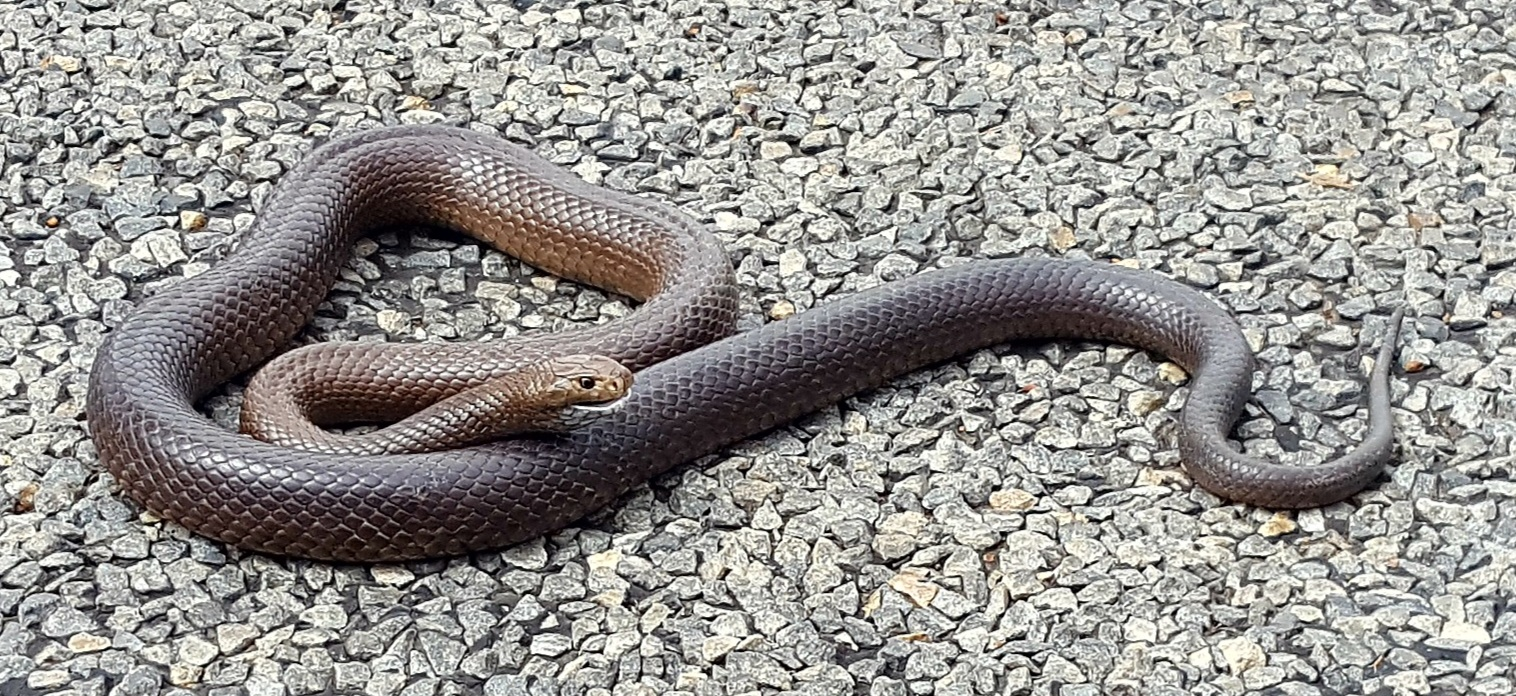
Very large dugite (about 2 m or 6 ft 7 in) seen on road near Mt Barker, Western Australia

== Behaviour ==
In the wild, dugites may be sheltering beneath logs and rocks. When disturbed, they are very shy and often slither away, but they will defend themselves if cornered. The species is diurnal. On hot days, activity occurs mainly in the morning, and to a lesser extent in the afternoon.

== Diet ==
Like all snakes, P. affinis is carnivorous, eating lizards, other snakes, mice and rats.

== Reproduction ==
As with all brown snakes, mating normally occurs between early September and late November. The dugite is an egg-laying (oviparous) snake, and typically deposits around 30 eggs and abandons them to self-incubate. The eggs hatch after about 65 days. Under optimal environmental conditions, the dugite has been known to lay two clutches during the same season.

== Envenomation ==
The venom of P. affinis is potentially one of the most lethal in the world, causing coagulopathic and procoagulant effects. Dugites generally avoid biting humans, but risks of encounters increase when they are most active during the mating season through October and November.

The last human death attributed to a dugite was in August 2015 in South Fremantle, when a woman was bitten on her heel mid-afternoon while walking alone. She walked home and later collapsed whilst her husband was taking her to her car to transport her to the hospital. The ambulance was called, arriving five minutes later, but medics were unable to revive her.

In January 2011, a seven-year-old Perth boy was bitten and temporarily paralyzed after a dugite entered his bedroom and wrapped itself around his arm while he slept. After receiving immediate medical attention, he made a full recovery.

In December 2020, a three-year-old girl was bitten by a snake, believed to be a dugite, while playing in a courtyard at her grandmother's unit complex in Mandurah. Her grandmother quickly immobilised her and wrapped her legs in pressure bandages. The girl was treated with anti-venom in hospital and made a full recovery.

== Taxonomy ==
The species was first described by Albert Günther in 1872. It is a member of the genus Pseudonaja, sometimes referred to as brown snakes, contained in the family Elapidae. The three subspecies descriptions currently accepted are:

- Pseudonaja affinis affinis Günther, 1872 — coastal mainland Western Australia
- Pseudonaja affinis exilis Storr, 1989 — mainland Western Australia and Rottnest Island
- Pseudonaja affinis tanneri (Worrell, 1961) — mainland Western Australia, Boxer Island and other islands in the Recherche Archipelago

Note: A trinomial authority in parentheses indicates that the subspecies was originally described in a genus other than Pseudonaja.

== In literature ==
Convicted Irish Fenian and civil rights activist, John Boyle O'Reilly, celebrated a bushman's myth of the "dukite" in his popular poem "The Dukite Snake", which can be found in his 1878 collection Songs, Legends and Ballads:

…
Now I'll change to a devil—ay, to a devil!
You needn't start; if a spirit of evil
Ever came to this world its hate to slake
On mankind, it came as a Dukite Snake.

Like? Like the pictures you've seen of Sin,
A long red snake—as if what was within
Was fire that gleamed through his glistening skin.
And his eyes—if you could go down to hell,
And come back to your fellows here and tell
What the fire was like, you could find no thing,
Here below on the earth, or up in the sky,
To compare it to but a Dukite's eye!

Now, mark you, these Dukites don't go alone:
There's another near when you see but one;
And beware you of killing that one that you see
Without finding the other; for you may be
More than twenty miles from the spot that night;
When camped, but you're tracked by the lone Dukite;
That will follow your trail like Death or Fate
And kill you as sure as you killed its mate.
…

The book ran to at least seven editions, and the poem has been discussed and anthologized since.

== See also ==
- The Dugites - Late 1970s–early 1980s Perth band
