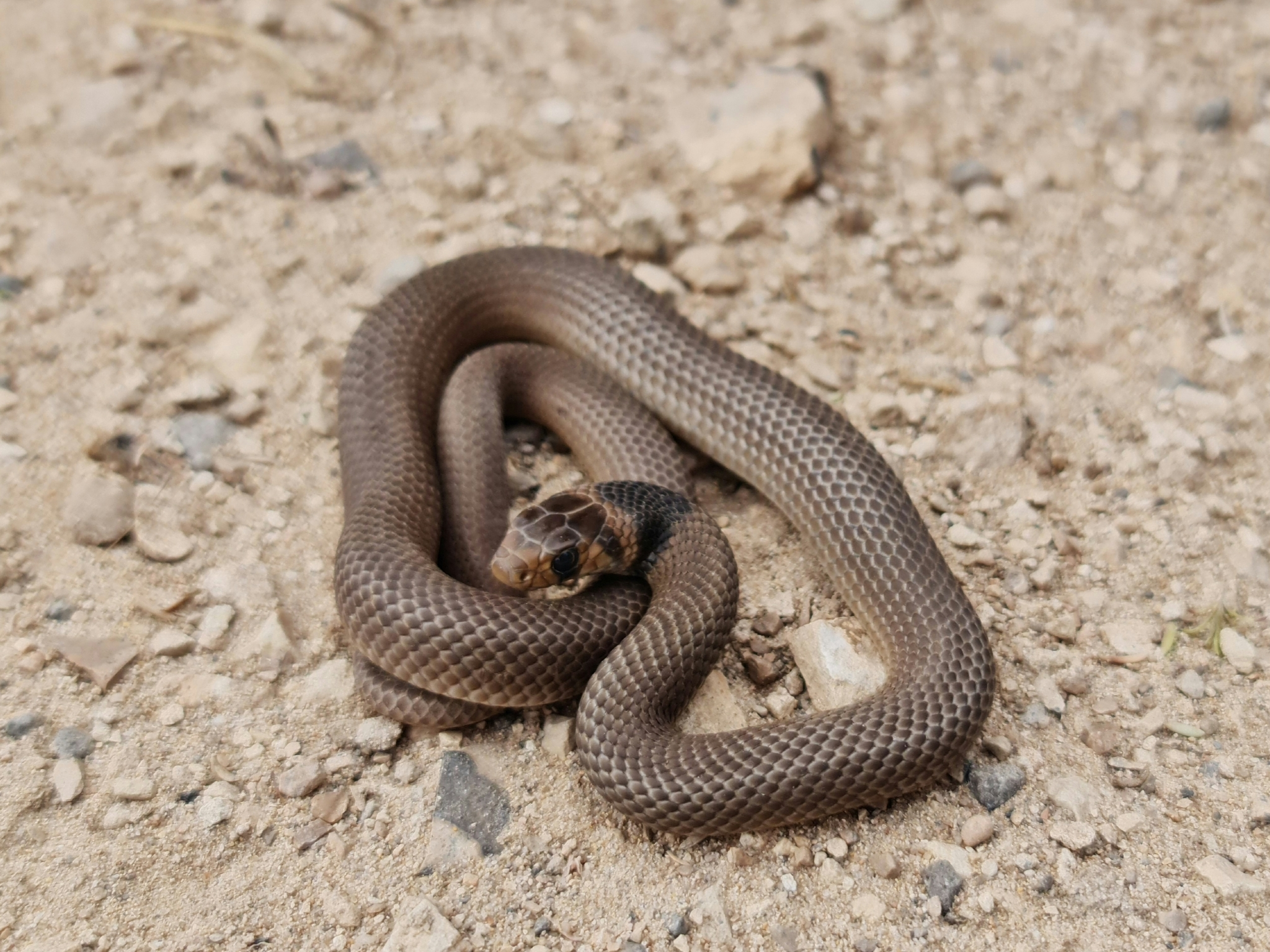

Conservation status
- Least Concern (IUCN 3.1)

Scientific classification
- Domain: Eukaryota
- Kingdom: Animalia
- Phylum: Chordata
- Class: Reptilia
- Order: Squamata
- Suborder: Serpentes
- Family: Elapidae
- Genus: Pseudonaja
- Species: P. inframacula

Binomial name
- Pseudonaja inframacula Waite, 1925

= Peninsula brown snake =

Highly venomous snake native to South Australia

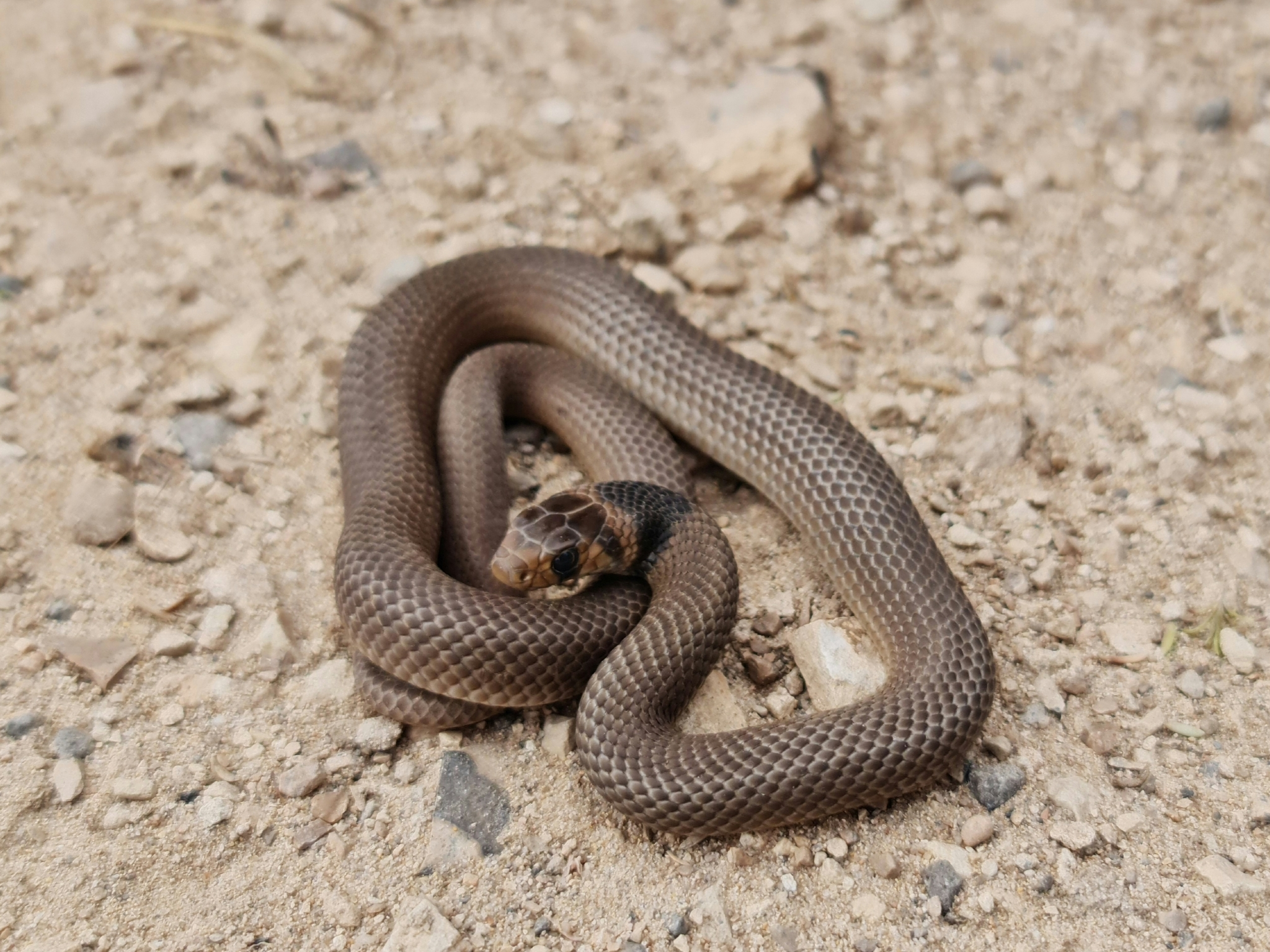

The peninsula brown snake (Pseudonaja inframacula) is a species of venomous elapid snake native to South Australia.
