= Venom-induced consumption coagulopathy =

- Other names: VICC

Venom-induced consumption coagulopathy (VICC) is a medical condition caused by the effects of some snake and caterpillar venoms on the blood. Important coagulation factors are activated by the specific serine proteases in the venom and as they become exhausted, coagulopathy develops. Symptoms are consistent with uncontrolled bleeding. Diagnosis is made using blood tests that assess clotting ability along with recent history of envenomation. Treatment generally involves pressure dressing, confirmatory blood testing, and antivenom administration.

== Signs and symptoms ==
Symptoms are similar to those seen in other consumptive coagulopathies. These include obvious bleeding from the nose, gums, intravenous lines, or puncture sites. More serious symptoms such as vomiting blood, intestinal bleeding, and hemorrhage of internal organs may also be seen.

== Pathophysiology ==
Venom-induced coagulopathy is caused by over-activation of the body's natural clotting system. This decreases clotting factor availability, thus impairing hemostasis. The exact mechanism by which this is accomplished varies greatly venom to venom. Some venoms cause something akin to disseminated intravascular coagulation, while others lack the microthrombi characteristic in this disorder. Procoagulant metalloproteinases in the venom promote a consumption coagulopathy by activating prothrombin, factor V, factor X or thrombin-like enzymes (fibrinogenases). Venom induced coagulopathy may also be accompanied by a thrombotic microangiopathy consisting of thrombocytopenia (low platelets), microangiopathic hemolytic anemia and acute kidney injury.

== Diagnosis ==
Diagnosis is established using various laboratory tests designed to test the function of the clotting system and other blood components. These tests include a complete blood count, prothrombin time with international normalized ratio, activated partial thromboplastin time, serum direct fibrinogen, and D-dimer. Abnormal values of these tests in combination with recent history of snakebite suggest VICC. The anticoagulation effects of snake venom can last for up to two weeks in some species without the administration of antivenom and should thus be considered as the relevant time course when distinguishing symptom causes.

== Treatment ==
Treatment revolves around rapid identification and prompt administration of antivenom. General principles of treatment also include application of pressure dressing, baseline blood tests, swabbing of bite site for venom, urinalysis, and follow-up serial bloodwork to monitor disease progression. However, there is some controversy as some venoms may work too quickly for antivenom to be of any use.
