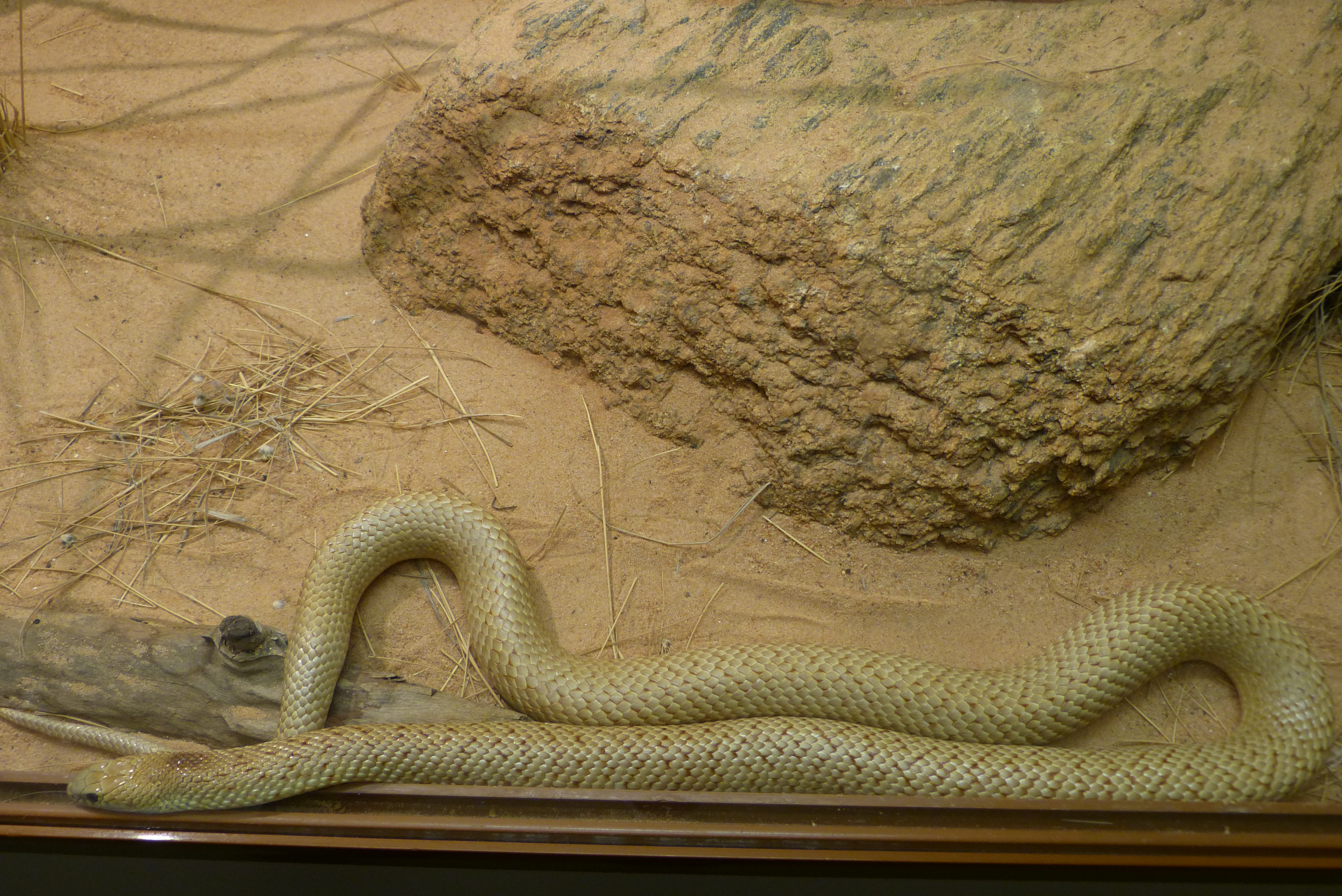

Scientific classification
- Kingdom: Animalia
- Phylum: Chordata
- Class: Reptilia
- Order: Squamata
- Suborder: Serpentes
- Family: Elapidae
- Genus: Pseudonaja
- Species: P. guttata

Binomial name
- Pseudonaja guttata (Parker, 1926)

Synonyms
- Demansia guttata Parker, 1926

= Speckled brown snake =

Highly venomous snake native to northeastern Australia

The speckled brown snake or spotted brown snake (Pseudonaja guttata) is a species of venomous elapid snake native to northeastern Australia.

== Taxonomy ==
English zoologist Hampton Wildman Parker described the speckled brown snake as Demansia guttata in 1926 from a specimen collected in Winton, Queensland. The brown snakes were moved to Pseudonaja by Australian naturalist Eric Worrell in the early 1960s on the basis of skull morphology, and reinforced by American herpetologist Samuel Booker McDowell in 1967 on the basis of the muscles of the venom glands. This classification has been followed by subsequent authors. A 2005 analysis using mitochondrial DNA found that the speckled brown snake was an early offshoot of the genus, with the taipans as more distantly related. A 2016 genetic analysis showed that the speckled brown snake was an early offshoot of a lineage giving rise to the taipans, rather than the other brown snakes.

== Description ==
The speckled brown snake grows to 1.4 m (4 ft 7 in) long. It has a small head, straw-yellow to orange upper parts, white throat and lips, and cream, yellow, or white under parts blotched with orange. Its scales have black edges that become visible when the snake bends or moves. Some snakes have wide, darker bands. It has 19–21 rows of dorsal scales at midbody, 190 to 220 ventral scales, 44 to 70 divided subcaudal scales (occasionally some of the anterior ones are undivided), and a divided anal scale. It is found in the eastern Northern Territory, western Queensland, and far northern South Australia. It lays a clutch of six eggs on average.

== Distribution ==
The speckled brown snake occurs in the Channel Country, Mitchell Grass Downs, and Mount Isa Inlier in Northern Territory, Queensland, and South Australia.

== Trophic relations ==
Frogs and lizards make up a large proportion of its diet, though it also eats small birds and mammals. Its venom is 1.6 times as toxic as that of the Indian cobra (Naja naja).

The curl snake (Suta suta) has been reported preying on speckled brown snakes at Goyder Lagoon in South Australia.
