= Kalam language =

Language native to Papua New Guinea

Kalam
- Native to: Papua New Guinea
- Region: Middle Ramu District, Madang Province; Mount Hagen District, Western Highlands Province
- Native speakers: (15,000 cited 1991)
- Language family: Trans–New Guinea: Madang; Rai Coast–Kalam; Kalamic; Kalam
- Dialects: Etp; Ti

Language codes
- ISO 639-3: kmh
- Glottolog: kala1397

Kalam is a Kalam language of Papua New Guinea. It is closely related to Kobon, and shares many of the features of that language. Kalam is spoken in Middle Ramu District of Madang Province and in Mount Hagen District of Western Highlands Province.

Following decades of studies by linguist Andrew Pawley and anthropologist Ralph Bulmer, Kalam is one of the best-studied Trans-New Guinea languages to date.

== Dialects ==
There are two distinct dialects of Kalam that are highly distinguishable from each other.

- Etp, with 20,000 speakers, is centered in the Upper Kaironk and Upper Simbai Valleys.
- Ti, with 5,000 speakers is centered in the Asai Valley. It includes the Tai variety.

Kobon is closely related.

Kalam has an elaborate pandanus avoidance register used during karuka harvest that has been extensively documented. The Kalam pandanus language, called alŋaw mnm (pandanus language) or ask-mosk mnm (avoidance language), is also used when eating or cooking cassowary.

== Phonology ==
=== Consonants ===
| | Bilabial | Dental- alveolar | Palatal | Velar | Labial- velar |
|---|---|---|---|---|---|
| Voiceless stops | p | t | c | k | |
| Voiced prenasalized stops | ᵐb | ⁿd | ᶮɟ | ᵑg | |
| Nasals stops | m | n | ɲ | ŋ | |
| Voiceless fricative | | s | | | |
| Lateral | | l | | | |
| Semivowels | | | j | | w |

=== Vowels ===
| | Front | Central | Back |
|---|---|---|---|
| High | (i) | | (u) |
| Mid | e | | o |
| Low | | a | |

== Evolution ==
Below are some Kalam reflexes of proto-Trans-New Guinea proposed by Pawley (2012, 2018). Data is from the Etp dialect unless otherwise noted. Data from Ti, the other major dialect, is also given when noted.

| proto-Trans-New Guinea | Kalam |
|---|---|
| (?)*su- 'bite' | su- |
| *(mb,m)elak 'light, lightning, brightness' | melk [melɨk] 'light' |
| *[w]ani 'who?' | an |
| *am(a,i) 'mother' | ami |
| *ambi 'man' | b [mbə] |
| *apus[i] 'grandparent' | aps [aβɨs] 'grandmother' |
| *aya 'sister' | ay |
| *-i(t,l) '2DU verbal suffix' | -it |
| *iman 'louse' | iman |
| *imbi 'name' | yb [yimp] |
| *-it '2/3 dual verbal suffix' | -it |
| *k(aw,o)nan 'shadow/spirit' | kawnan 'spirit of the dead' |
| *k(o,u)ma(n,ŋ)[V] 'neck, nape' | koŋam (metathesis) (cf. Kobon uŋam, loss of *k) |
| *kakV- 'carry on shoulder' | kak- |
| *kamb(a,u)u[na] 'stone' | kab [kamp] |
| *kanim 'cuscus' | kmn 'game mammal (generic)' |
| *kin(i,u)[m]- 'sleep' | kn- [kɨn] |
| *kindil 'root' | kdl [kɨndɨl] |
| *kinV- 'sleep' | kn- |
| *kumut, *tumuk 'thunder' | tumuk |
| *kumV- 'die' | kum- |
| *m(o,u)k 'milk, sap, breast' | muk (Ti dialect mok) |
| *ma- 'not' | ma- |
| *ma(n,k,L)[a] 'ground' | man |
| *maŋgat[a] 'teeth' | meg [meŋk] |
| *maŋgV 'compact round object, egg' | magi |
| *mapVn 'liver' | mapn |
| *mbalaŋ 'flame' | malaŋ, maŋlaŋ |
| *mbapa 'father' | bapi |
| *mo[k,ŋg]Vm 'joint' | mogm |
| *muk 'brain' | muk |
| *muk 'milk' | muk (Ti dialect mok) |
| *mund-maŋgV 'heart' | mudmagi |
| *mV 'taro' | m |
| *mVkVm 'jaw, cheek' | mkem 'cheek' |
| *mVn[a]-'be, live, stay' | md- |
| *n(o,u)man 'mind, soul' | noman 'soul' |
| *na '1SG' | -n-, -in '1SG subj. agreement' |
| *niman 'louse' | iman |
| *nok 'water' | ñg |
| *nu '1PL independent' | -nu-, -un '1PL subj. agreement' |
| *nV 'child' | ñi 'son' |
| *nVŋg- 'know, hear, see' | ng- (Ti dialect), nŋ- 'see, perceive, etc.' |
| *ŋaŋ[a] 'baby' | -ŋaŋ 'baby' |
| *panV 'female' | pañ 'daughter' |
| *sambV 'cloud' | seb [semp] |
| *saŋ 'story, song' | saŋ 'women's song' |
| *saŋgil 'hand, finger' | (?) saglaŋ 'little finger' |
| *si(m,mb)(i,u) 'guts' | sb [sɨmp] |
| *sisi | ss [sɨs] 'urine' |
| *sVkVm 'smoke' | skum, sukum |
| *takVn[V] 'moon' | takn [taɣɨn] |
| *tu 'axe' | tu |
| *tuk- 'cut' | tk- 'sever' |
| *tumuk, *kumut 'thunder' | tumuk |
| *tVk- 'cut, cut off' | tk- 'sever, cut off' |
| *-un '1st plural subject' | -un |
| *-Vn '1SG subj. agreement' | -n, -in |
| *walaka 'testicles' | walak |
| *wani 'who?' | an |
| *wati 'fence' | wati |
| *yaka 'bird' | yakt |

== Verbs ==
Kalam has eight tense-aspect categories. There are four past tenses, two present tenses, and two future tenses, which are all marked using suffixes:

- past habitual
- remote past (yesterday or earlier)
- today's past
- immediate past
- present habitual
- present progressive
- immediate future
- future

Intransitive verbs in Kalam can be classified as either active or stative. Some active intransitive verbs are:

- am- 'go'
- kn- 'sleep'
- jak- 'stand, dance'
- kum- 'die, cease to function'

Some stative verbs are:

- pag- '(of things) break, be broken'
- sug- '(of a fire) go out'
- yn- 'burn, be burnt, fully cooked'
- wk- '(of solid objects and surfaces) crack, burst, shatter'

=== Serial verb constructions ===
Transitivity is derived using resultative or cause-effect serial verb constructions.

pak sug-
strike extinguished
'put out a fire'

pak wk-
strike shattered
'knock something to bits, shatter something'

pug sug-
blow extinguished
'blow out a flame'

puŋi ask-
pierce opened
'prise something open'

puŋi lak-
pierce split
'split something by wedging or levering'

taw pag yok-
step.on broken displaced
'break something off by stepping on it'

tb kluk yok-
cut gouge displaced
'gouge something out'

Other serial verb constructions in Kalam include:

- d ap (get come) 'bring'
- d am (get go) 'take'
- am d ap (go get come) 'fetch'
- d nŋ (touch perceive) 'feel'
- ñb nŋ (eat perceive) 'taste'
- tb tk (cut sever) 'cut off'

== Nouns ==
=== Compounds ===
Some examples of nominal compounds in Kalam:

bin-b
woman-man
'person, people'

ña-pañ
son-daughter
'child, children'

aps-basd
grandmother-grandfather
'grandparents'

ami-gon bapi-gon
mother-children father-children
'nuclear family, parents and children'

kmn-as
game.mammal-small.wild.mammal
'wild mammals'

kaj-kayn-kobti
pig-dog-cassowary
'large animals'

kmn-kaj-kobti
game.mammal-pig-cassowary
'animals that provide ceremonially valued meat'

mñ-mon
vine-tree
'land, country, territory, world'

kneb ameb owep wog wati gep
sleeping going coming garden fence making
'everyday activities'

=== Animal names ===
Fauna classification (folk taxonomy) in the Kalam language has been extensively studied by Ralph Bulmer and others. Kalam speakers classify wild mammals into three major categories:

- kmn 'game mammals, larger wild mammals': tree kangaroos, wallabies, cuscuses, ringtail possums, giant rats, and bandicoots
- as 'small wild mammals': most bush-rats, sugar gliders, and pygmy possums (including Pogonomys spp., Melomys spp., and Phascolosorex dorsalis)
- kopyak 'dirty rats' (Rattus spp.)

Other animal categories are:

- yakt 'flying birds and bats'
- kobti 'cassowaries'
- kaj 'pigs' (formerly including cattle, horses, and goats when first encountered by the Kalam)
- kayn 'dogs'
- soyŋ 'certain snakes'
- yñ 'skinks'

Rodent names include:

- House Rat (Rattus exulans, Rattus niobe, Rattus ruber) – kopyak ~ kupyak
- Garden Rat (Rattus ruber) – kopyak gulbodu
- Long-snouted Rat (Rattus verecundus) – sjaŋ
- Small Mountain Rat (Rattus niobe) – katgn
- Prehensile-tailed Rat (Bush-tailed Giant Rat) (Pogonomelomys sevia) – ymgenm ~ yamganm, beŋtud, gtkep
- Giant Bamboo Rat (Rothschild's Woolly Rat) (Mallomys rothschildi) – mosak; aloñ, kabkal, maklek
- Giant Cane Rat (Hyomys goliath) – mumuk
- Grassland Melomys Rat (Melomys rufescens) – alks
- Lorentz's Rat (Melomys lorentzii, Melomys platyops) – mug; moys (M. lorentzii spreads Pandanus julianettii (alŋaw) seeds, according to the Kalam)
- rat that feeds on pandanus nuts (Anisomys imitator) – gudi-ws ~ gudl-ws
- Highland Giant Tree Rat (Uromys anak) – abben
- Lowland Giant Tree Rat (Uromys caudimaculatus) – kabkal
- Mountain Water-rat (Hydromys shawmayeri) – kuypep kuykuy-sek
- Waterside Rat (Parahydromys asper) – godmg, ñabap
- Earless Water Rat (Crossomys moncktoni) – kuypep
- small rat, found near homesteads – walcegon

Marsupial names include:

- Pseudochirops corinnae (Golden or Stationary Ringtail) – wcm; puŋi-mdep; wlpog
- Pseudochirops cupreus (Copper Ringtail) – ymduŋ; bald, kagm, kas-gs, tglem-tud
- Pseudochirulus forbesi – (Painted Ringtail) – skoyd; boñay
- Cercartetus caudatus (Pygmy Possum) – sumsum
- Dactylopsila palpator (Mountain striped possum, Long-fingered Triok) – blc
- Echymipera sp. – ? yaked
- Phalanger carmelitae (Black Mountain Cuscus) – maygot, ? yng-tud
- Phalanger gymnotis (Ground Cuscus) – madaw; ket-ketm, kñm
- Phalanger maculatus – aklaŋ; aklaŋ kawl-kas-ket, aklaŋ pk, gabi, takp
- Phalanger orientalis – ? madaw, ? takp
- Phalanger vestitus permixtio – ? kmn sbi
- Phalanger sericeus (Silky Cuscus, Beech Cuscus) – atwak; añ, beŋ-tud
- Phalanger sp. – sbi, yaked
- Spilocuscus maculatus – takp
- Microperoryctes longicauda (Long-tailed Bandicoot) – wgi; amgln, weñem
- Peroryctes raffrayana (Hunting Bandicoot) – pakam
- Phascolosorex dorsalis – aln; may also refer to Antechinus melanurus (Marsupial Rat)
- Dasyurus albopunctatus (New Guinea Quoll, Marsupial Cat) – suatg
- Dendrolagus goodfellowi (Tree Kangaroo) - kabacp, kabcp
- Petaurus breviceps (Sugar Glider) – aymows, kajben, yegaŋ
- Thylogale brunii (Bush Wallaby) – kutwal ~ kotwal
- Dorcopsulus vanheurni (Small Forest Wallaby, Common Mountain Forest Wallaby) - sgaw

Reptile names and folk taxonomy in Kalam:

- yñ: reptiles
  - yñ yb: familiar small lizards
    - yñ ladk: gecko
    - yñ yb: skink
      - yñ yb: colonial skinks
        - kls: Papuascincus stanleyanus, Common skink
        - mabdagol: Papuascincus stanleyanus, Red-tailed skink
        - mas: Emoia spp., Ant skinks (including E. baudini [most common], E. pallidiceps, and perhaps also E. kordoana)
      - yñ ladk: non-colonial skinks
        - sydn: Prasinohaema prehensicauda, Casuarina skink
          - sydn km: Green casuarina skink
          - sydn mlep: Brown casuarina skink
        - mañmod: Prasinohaema flavipes, Tree skink
        - pymakol: Lobulia elegans, Beech skink
        - mamŋ: Sphenomorphus darlingtoni, Begonia skink
        - komñ: Sphenomorphus sp.nr. jobiensis, Bush skink
        - ñgñolom: Sphenomorphus leptofasciatus, Banded skink
        - wowy: Lepidodactylus sp., Common gecko
  - yñ ladk: reptiles other than familiar small lizards
    - aypot: Hypsilurus nigrigularis, Dragon lizard
    - wbl: Varanus spp.
      - wbl km: Varanus prasinus, Emerald monitor
      - wbl yb: Varanus indicus, Water monitor
    - ñom: snakes
      - soyŋ; ñom: relatively harmless snakes
        - klŋan: Chondropython viridis, Green python
        - soyŋ: ordinary snakes, Tropidonophis montanus, Toxicocalamus loriae, etc.
          - soyŋ yb
          - soyŋ pok: reddish snake
          - soyŋ mosb: dark green snake
      - sataw: terrifying serpents
        - ymgwp: Python spp.
        - nm: Python amethistinus, Giant python
        - jjoj: snake sp.
        - kodkl: Acanthophis laevis, Death adder (?)
        - sataw: Micropechis ikaheca, Small-eyed snake (?)
        - other terrifying reptiles

Frog names in Kalam are:

- Litoria angiana (various phenotypes): komnaŋat, jejeg, (jejeg) pkay, kawag
  - komnaŋat: bright green polymorph; usually found in Saurauia spp. and Ficus dammaropsis
  - kawag: dark green or black polymorph
  - jejeg: four types:
    - jejeg pkay: polymorph with reddish belly
    - jejeg mj-kmab or jejeg km: bright green polymorph
    - jejeg mlep: dull brown polymorph
    - jejeg mosb: black polymorph
- Litoria arfakiana: daŋboŋ
- Litoria modica (or Litoria becki): wyt
- Litoria micromembrana: kosoj
- Litoria bulmeri: kogop
- Nyctimystes disruptus: kwyos, gepgep
  - kiwos: red-bellied polymorphs
- Nyctimystes foricula: gojmay (also bin-pk)
- Nyctimystes kubori: kwelek
- Nyctimystes narinosus: mabas
- Nyctimystes sp.: kabanm
- Oxydactyla brevicrus: kabanm
- Cophixalus parkeri: kabanm [mature], lk (including bopnm) [immature]
- Cophixalus riparius: gwnm
- Cophixalus shellyi: gwnm sbmganpygak
- Choerophryne variegata: lk (including bopnm)
- Asterophrys sp.: gwnm
- Xenorhina rostrata: gwnm
- Barygenys sp.: gwnm sbmganpygak
- Papurana grisea: akpt, cebs

Note: Cophixalus shellyi, Choerophryne darlingtoni, and Oxydactyla brevicrus also tend to be identified by Kalam speakers as lk if calling from low vegetation, but as gwnm (usually applied to Cophixalus riparius and Xenorhina rostrata) if found in daytime hiding spots.

Plant categories include:

- mon 'trees and shrubs' (excluding palms and pandans); e.g., bljan ‘Macaranga spp.’ is a mon that has four named kinds
- mñ 'vines and robust creepers'

A comprehensive list of Kalam plant and animal names is given below.

Kalam plant and animal names

| Kalam | Scientific name | Common name | Type |
|---|---|---|---|
| (?) mañ, wnb | | Tahitian chestnut | |
| (G) ald, ajay, gagn, gmdoŋ = gumdoŋ, gubodm, jam, jejaw, kaj-kot = kaj-kut, kdiplŋ, kiaw, kopnm, kosay, kubap, mluk-ps, mŋay, mseŋ wask, mutuŋ, (K) old = (G) ald, mutuŋ, wask, weñ, yam, yluŋ | Ficus spp. | | |
| (G) cb-yng; ymanŋn pl-pat | | moustached treeswift | |
| (G) kosad, (K) kosod | Themeda australis | kangaroo grass | |
| (G) mab-yb, (K) mon-yb; ymn | Frullania sp. | | |
| (G) slek yakt, (K) slk-yakt | | blue-capped ifrit | |
| (K) ald-magi-ket, (G) ald-magl-ket; maldapan-kl | Rhamphocharis crassirostris | spotted berrypecker | |
| (K) als aydk, (G) als ladk | Levieria becarriana | | |
| (K) añmi, (G) añml, bawl, dawl, kuyn, ? smay-kolay | Cyathea sp. or spp. | | |
| (K) gudi = (G) gudl; cod, ktem | Pandanus antaresensis | | |
| (K) gudi-ws = (G) gudl-ws | Anisomys imitator | rat that feeds on pandanus nuts | |
| (K) gudi-ws, (G) guld-ws | Anisomys imitator | | |
| (K) gusay-kob, (G) gusalkob; molaj | | shield bug | |
| (K) jolbeg pk, (G) jolbeg pok, jolbeg sml | Rhipidura atra | | females and immature males |
| (K) jolbeg pk, (G) jolbeg pok; jolbeg sml | | black fantail | females and immature males |
| (K) kotp | | spider's web | generic |
| (K) kuŋb pk, (G) kuŋb pok | | sickle-crested bird-of-paradise | mature male |
| (K) magi kotp, (G) magl katp | | painted ringtail possum's nest | |
| (K) maydapan = (G) maldapan | | flowerpecker | |
| (K) maydapan, (G) maldapan | | berrypecker | generic |
| (K) mmañp | | Whitehead's swiftlet | |
| (K) mmañp, (G) mmeñp | | Pacific swallow | |
| (K) mmañp, (G) mmeñp | | swiftlet | generic |
| (K) mon-yb, (G) mab-yb | | moss | generic |
| (K) old = (G) ald, alud | Ficus augusta | | |
| (K) old, (G) ald, alud | Ficus hesperidiiformis | | |
| (K) pd = (G) ped | Dioscorea | | generic |
| (K) pd, (G) ped | Dioscorea spp., Dioscorea alata | yam | generic |
| (K) sakp, (G) sakay | Saccharum edule | | generic |
| (K) slk-ñu, (G) slek-ñu | Pittosporum tenuivalve | | |
| (K) slk-yakt, (G) slekyakt | Ifrita kowaldi | | |
| (K) slp, (G) slup | | tail feathers of certain long-tailed birds-of-paradise | |
| (K) tdpn-mon, (G) tdpn-mab | Meliosma pinnata | | |
| (K) yabay, (G) yabal | | lesser bird-of-paradise | |
| (PL) alnaw majnb | | pandanus | generic |
| ? | Gallinago hardwickii ? | snipe sp. | |
| ? aleg | Lepidagathis sp. | | |
| ? aŋmip, jmad, klŋan | Morelia viridis | green tree python | |
| ? dob | Accipiter buergersi | Buerger's goshawk | |
| ? glmd | | red-sided eclectus parrot | |
| ? god | Accipiter novaehollandiae | | |
| ? gogiben aydk | Dioscorea sp. | | |
| ? gokal | Eurystomus orientalis | | |
| ? gokal | Oriolus szalayi | oriole | |
| ? gokob | Cracticus cassicus | black-headed butcherbird | |
| ? gopkob | Amalocichla incerta | lesser New Guinea thrush | |
| ? kabay asdal, ? kabay kl | Diphyllodes magnificus | | |
| ? kabay wog-dep; (K) kabay pk, (G) kabay pok | Parotia carolae | | |
| ? kabi-kas-ket | Gerygone chloronota | grey-headed tree warbler | |
| ? kaj-tmd, god | Falco peregrinus | peregrine falcon | |
| ? kaj-ypl-si-dak, ? koptt, ? yptt, ? yptut | Ducula chalconota | red-breasted imperial pigeon | |
| ? kapi-kñopl, kñopl | Rallus philippensis | | |
| ? kiaw | Ficus copiosa, Ficus wassa | | |
| ? kmn sbi | Phalanger permixteo | | |
| ? kodkol | Acanthophis antarcticus | | |
| ? koŋak sd-ket, koŋak mseŋ-ket, kapi koŋak | Rallus pectoralis | slate-breasted rail | |
| ? koptt, ? kaj-ypl-si-dak, ? yptut | Ducula zoeae | Zoe's imperial pigeon | |
| ? kosodyakt | Mirafra javanica | bush-lark | |
| ? kotleg, jjgayaŋ | Monachella muelleriana | river flycatcher | |
| ? kulep | Aegotheles archboldi | | |
| ? kulep | Eurostopodus archboldi | Archbold's nightjar | |
| ? kulwak, ? tabal | Charmosyna josefinae | | phases |
| ? madaw, ? takp | Phalanger orientalis | | |
| ? mmañp | Collocalia vanikorensis | lowland swiftlet | |
| ? mosak kejŋ | Macruromys major | bamboo rat | |
| ? mukbel | Gallicolumba jobiensis | white-breasted ground dove | |
| ? mumjel | Ninox connivens | barking owl | |
| ? mumjel, mumjel magi nokom | Podargus ocellatus | little Papuan frogmouth | |
| ? mutuŋ | Ficus calopilina, Ficus pachyrrachis | | |
| ? sataw | Micropechis ikaheka | small-eyed snake | |
| ? sbaw | Cacomantis castaneiventris | | |
| ? sdwey-madwey | Chalcites lucidus | shining cuckoo | |
| ? señŋ | Timeliopsis fulvigula | mountain straight-billed honeyeater | |
| ? sjweywey | Acanthiza murina | thornbill | |
| ? skek | Sericornis papuensis | Papuan wren-warbler | |
| ? skp | Schefflera inophylloides, Schefflera stolleana | | |
| ? spsep gs | Neositta chrysoptera | Papuan sittella | |
| ? tabal | | Josephine's lory | |
| ? tumuk-yakt | Charmosyna placentis | yellow-fronted blue-eared lory | |
| ? wask | Ficus arfakiensis | | |
| ? waymad | Euodia | | |
| ? yabagay | Megapodius freycinet | scrubhen | |
| ? yabay asdal | Paradisaea rudolphi | | |
| ? yaked | Echimipera sp. | | |
| abben | Uromys anak | black-tailed tree rat or highland giant tree rat | |
| ablabl, binmuŋ | Ascarina philippinensis | | |
| ablay | Schefflera forbesii | | |
| abok | Artocarpus lacucha | | |
| abownm | Talegalla jobiensis | brown-collared brushturkey | |
| acc, aknaŋ, alsas, cbam, gajt, kaban, kadŋ, ken, keykal, kñg, kolem, kolem lkañ, kolem tud, kowñak, luol, magepnap, mayj, moyg, mugut, ñnagl, nmug, pd ñn agal, pd sgoy, sajep, sam, sbi, sgoy, sobu, soŋ, suan, wanab | Dioscorea spp. | yam | cultivated kinds |
| ackol, ackolkol, koptob | | sphagnum moss | |
| acomc = acowmc | Callicarpa longifolia | | |
| act, kaban, (K) pd, (G) ped; suan | Dioscorea alata | | |
| adbt, ckl, (K) mkol (=alp mkol), (G) mokol | | fruit-bat | kinds |
| add | Vaccinium keysseri | | |
| adlup, dlep | Cypraea annulus | Cypraea annulus shells and necklaces | |
| admaw, admaw lkañ, aŋmd, awel, bitbit, glaŋm, gum, kceki sblam, kmn sblam, ñg-pakn, plin, sblam, sskanay, yb, ymeb-bd | Cordyline | | varieties |
| adom, awayŋ, bangol, gaygay, guglak, kas-pat, kawel, msagay, msu, pkay, pnm, ssalkay, walb, wanay, wlak, yamganmtob | Alpinia sp. or spp. | | |
| adug, cecey, ceycey | Pseudeos fuscata | dusky lory | |
| aglg, camaŋ, cebey, cemen, dot, spel, wayam, wls, ygam | | marita (pandanus) | kinds |
| aglog | Leucosyke sp. | | |
| agnoŋ | Syzygium pachycladum | | |
| agnoŋ; jbl = jbul, jbul kas-at-ket, jbul kas ñluk, jbul kub tŋi = jbul kub-tŋi-ket, jbul lkañ, jbul tun, jeŋn, jjelŋ = jjlŋ | Syzygium spp. | | |
| agol | Podocarpus archboldii | | |
| ajn, kalap ajn | Balanophora sp. | | |
| ajok, gb | Australimusa variety | | |
| akañ | Coix lacryma-jobi | Job's tears | |
| akl | Nastus spp., Racemobambus sp., Schizostachyum sp. | | |
| aklaŋ, añ, atwak, gabi, kñm, madaw, magey, maygot, sbi, takp, yaked, yng-tud | | cuscus | kinds |
| aklaŋ, gabi | | spotted cuscus | |
| aklaŋ; aklaŋ awl-kas-ket, aklaŋ pk, gabi, takp | Phalanger maculatus | | |
| akm-gi | Halfordia kendack | | |
| akow, ktu | Areca catechu | betel-nut | |
| alad, cmgan, kiwak, klwak, saymon | | lorikeet | kinds |
| alad, klwak, kob, sg, tabal | | Papuan lory | |
| aleg | Solanum americanum | | |
| aleg alomn | Dicliptera papuana | | |
| aljm, aybiskes | Hibiscus rosa-sinensis | | |
| alkn aydk, kamay alkn | Piper triangulare | | |
| alkn jejen | Piper gibbilimbum | | |
| alkn kuysek | Piper subbullatum | | |
| alkn yb = alkn ybl | Piper sp. | | |
| alks | Melomys frigicola ?; Melomys rufescens | white-bellied rat | |
| alks | Melomys rufescens | grassland Melomys rat | |
| aln | Phascolosorex dorsalis | dasyurid, marsupial rat | |
| aln, as aln | Antechinus melanurus | marsupial rat | |
| alnay, ytem = ytm | Pandanus adinobotrys | | |
| alŋ, alŋ lkañ | Eulalia trispicata | grass, Eulalia trispicata | |
| alŋaw, salm | Medinilla sp. | | |
| alŋaw, spagep, (PL) mukut, (PL) sagitap, spagep | Pandanus brosimos | | generic |
| alŋaw-nm | Melidectes belfordi schraderensis | Belford's melidectes | |
| alp | | fruit-bat | generic |
| alp, madan, jan madan | Dobsonia moluccensis | greater bare-backed fruit bat | |
| als | Kibara sp., Steganthera hirsuta | | |
| al-wj, gulwj, kabapk | | huntsman spider or trapdoor spider | |
| amos aydk, molom, palm, saŋañ | | wild cucurbit | |
| amos, buk | Lagenaria siceraria | | |
| añb, kl = kli, kodpab, kolay, malŋ, malŋ pk | Rungia klossii | | cultivated kinds |
| aneŋ, kob, yagab | | marita (pandanus) | generic |
| anŋes | Triumfetta nigricans | | |
| aŋmip, klŋan | | green tree python | |
| aŋmt | Milvus migrans | black kite | |
| apay, bljan, cabak, dlep, gaslŋ, gengen, glgl, gojmay, jak, jlgu, mdaj, mkut, pagi, mokub, peñl, sbkep, sklek, sml, tbep, wsp | Pandanus brosimos | | kinds |
| as | Abeomelomys sevia | tree fern rat | |
| askum, kabay askom, gokal | | dollarbird | |
| as-magi, jjmd | Rhododendron macgregoriae | | |
| asŋap | Ischaemum polystachyum | | |
| asŋap lkañ | Ischaemum sp. | | |
| asŋap, gaj, gubodm, guñ, kabapk, kapn, kaynam, kodkem, kol, kusal = kusay, mokol, molad, molay, plp, sben, tkol, ttpak | Saccharum edule | | kinds |
| ass, gog, gog | Saurauia sp. or spp. | | |
| atwak; añ, beŋ-tud | Phalanger sericeus | silky cuscus, beech cuscus | |
| awleg lek | Garnotia stricta | | |
| aymows, kajben, (Asai) yegaŋ | Petaurus breviceps | sugar glider | |
| ayŋ numud | Solanum oliverianum | | |
| ayŋ, wdawd | Dimorphanthera spp. | | |
| ayplow | Polygonum nepalense | | |
| aypoki ksen-nep owp | Conyza parva | | |
| aypoki, sbomj | Conyza bonariensis | | |
| aypot, kuom | | agamid lizard, dragon lizard | |
| aywol | Thysanolaena maxima | | |
| bajj | Erythrura trichroa | parrotfinch | |
| bal | Macaranga rufibarbis | | |
| bal | | bean | generic |
| bal, bljan, bljan kas-pat, peyj, sapol, sapol mseŋ-ket, sapol semeñ-tin, suosu, weñgaw | Macaranga spp. | | |
| balbag | Desmodium repandum | | |
| balpon | Arthrophyllum macranthum | | |
| bangay | Cucurbita spp. | | |
| bata | Persea americana | | |
| batt | Senna septemtrionalis | | |
| bawd | Manihot esculenta | cassava | |
| baynap | Ananas sativus | | |
| bblaw | Merops ornatus | bee-eater | |
| bbomol, bbomol aydk | Palmeria sp. | | |
| bc, dŋ | | grass finch | |
| bdabd | Phyllanthus flariflorus | | |
| bdoŋ, ksks | | Princess Stephanie's bird-of-paradise | mature male |
| bed, kmn-gd | Gleichenia sp. | | |
| beg | Perrottetia alpestris | | |
| bep, (PL) pesel | Rungia klossii | | generic |
| biay, gmeñ | | red-capped streaked lory | |
| binmuŋ | Ascarina subsessilis | | |
| bitbit, gtigti | Crotalaria lanata | rattle-pod | |
| blc | Dactylopsila palpator | mountain striped possum | |
| bleb | Gallicolumba beccarii | Beccari's ground dove | |
| blegñ | Geniostoma sp. | | |
| bley, bleynm | Aepypodius arfakianus | wattled brushturkey | |
| bljan kas-pat | Macaranga induta | | |
| bodi | Embelia cotinoides | | |
| bodi, muglpen | Maesa spp. | | |
| bokbak | Commelina cyanea | | |
| bopl | Imperata cylindrica, etc. | kunai grass | |
| bot, ddblŋ | Dennstaedtia scandens | | |
| btud | Phaseolus vulgaris | | |
| buk galab | Melicope sp., Prunus sp. or spp. | | |
| buk mataw, gabaw, mataw, ñoŋud kas-ps | Cryptocarya spp. | | |
| calab bwow, gojayab = gojeyab | | phasmids | kinds |
| cangom, gabaw, ñepek, pagn ñepek, ps-tkn, waŋ-magi, wokd | Cyrtandra sp. or spp. | | |
| ccp | | goshawk | generic |
| ccp kamay-ket | Accipiter melanochlamys | black-mantled goshawk | |
| ccp mseŋ-ket | Accipiter fasciatus | Australian goshawk | |
| ccpen, tden | Desmodium sequax | | |
| cedmay | | little king bird-of-paradise | |
| celed, kamay celed | Nothofagus grandis | | |
| celed, kamay, kamay kas-ñluk, kamay kaskam, kamay ydlum | Nothofagus sp. or spp. | southern beech | |
| cgem | Dolichos lablab, Lablab purpureus | pea bean | |
| cgoy | Nicotiana tabacum | | |
| cgoy aydk | Cynoglossum sp. | | |
| cgoy numd | | forget-me-not | |
| cm | | black palm | |
| cmnm | Urena lobata | | |
| cocwoñ | | mole cricket | |
| codok | Psychotria hollandiae | | |
| codok kas ñluk | Drimys sp. | | |
| codok, codok kas-ps, m-ypl | Psychotria sp. or spp. | | |
| cp-asŋap, kaynam | Ischaemum barbatum | | |
| cp-nabgu | Hydnophytum sp. or spp. | | |
| cp-nabgu | Peltops montanus | mountain peltops flycatcher | |
| cp-sgi | Ricinus communis | | |
| cp-tamu, tamu | Paspalum conjugatum, Paspalum sp. | | |
| cptmel bojm, pubnm | | European honeybee | |
| cuklm | Galium subtrifidum | | |
| dagol | Scincella stanleyana | | |
| dak, patow | | domestic duck | |
| daŋb | Rapanea spp., Tasmannia piperita | | |
| daŋb aydk | Ardisia sp. | | |
| daŋb, gojb, gtkep, mes | Timonius sp. or spp. | | |
| db | Dacrydium novoguineense | | |
| dinm, dinum | Leucanthus peduncularis | | |
| dinum acb | Hydrocotyle sp. | | |
| dkbn | Sterculia monticola | | |
| dmŋawt kosbol | Circus spilonotus | spotted marsh harrier | |
| dŋ; bic | Lonchura spectabilis | mannikin, grass finch | |
| dob | | woodswallow | |
| dobeg, wlek–ñŋeb | Coniogramme macrophylla | | |
| dog | Neonauclea obversifolia | | |
| dsn | Diplazium latilobum | | |
| dsn, gañgal, sspi, yuley | Elatostema sp. or spp. | | |
| duk | Harpyopsis novaeguineae | harpy eagle | |
| gabaw | Litsea spp. | | |
| gabjen | Sloania nymanii | | |
| gablog | Smilax sp. | | |
| gac | Megalurus timoriensis | rufous-capped grass warbler | |
| gac, kolay, sgaw, sgaw tmd, slb | Rungia klossii | | uncultivated kinds |
| gad, tukum | Wendlandia paniculata | | |
| gadmab, godmab, gadmab b-tepsek, gamñ | Ptilinopus ornatus | ornate fruit dove, fruit pigeon | |
| gadon | Nastus elatus | | |
| gagn | Ficus dammaropsis | | |
| gaks, kolem, pd kolem | Dioscorea bulbifera | yam | generic |
| galkañ yb | Maoutia sp. | | |
| galkneŋ | | sicklebill bird-of-paradise | female and immature male |
| gam | Saccharum officinarum | sugarcane | |
| gamgam | Osmoxylon boerlagi | | |
| gaml, gaml kl | Saccharum spontaneum | | |
| gañgal, jjeyp kuysek, sspi | Pilea sp. | | |
| gaslŋ | Neopsittacus musschenbroekii | yellow-billed mountain lory | |
| gaygay, gugolŋ, msagay, ymgenm-tob | Riedelia sp. | | |
| gayk | Erythrina orientalis | coral tree | |
| gd | Sticherus brassii | | |
| gd, lps | Glochidion sp. or spp. | | |
| gepgep | Nyctimystes foricula | | |
| get, get kab, get yb, goñbl | Aglaia spp. | | |
| get, goñbl | Dysoxylum spp. | | |
| ggamaŋ | Solanum dammerianum | | |
| ggan | Piptocalyx sp. | | |
| ggayaŋ | | torrent-lark or magpie-lark | |
| gglñ | Isachne sp., Lachnogrostis sp. | | |
| gis, kamay-gis | Neopsittacus pullicauda | orange-billed mountain lory | |
| gkt, kon, mays | Zea mays | corn, maize | generic |
| gldb, golbd mñ | Tecomanthe volubilis | | |
| glegl, ? skey | | brown hawk | |
| glegl; dob | Falco berigora | brown hawk | |
| glmd, kapal, yawed, ydam | | Pesquet's parrot | |
| glob, gokob, molop | | black-headed butcherbird | |
| gluj, kabapk | | huntsman spider | |
| gmeñ, biay | Psitteuteles goldiei | red-capped streaked lory | |
| goblad, goblad yob, kuyopi | Microsorum musifolium | | |
| god, god-gayaŋ, ? kaj-numd | Accipiter meyerianus | Meyer's goshawk | |
| god, kaj-wsd | | peregrine falcon | |
| godd, wtay godd | | yellow crest feathers of sulphur-crested cockatoo | |
| godmay-ket | Charmosyna wilhelminae | pygmy streaked lory | |
| godmg, ñabap | Parahydromys asper | waterside rat | |
| gogadŋ | | parasitic worms, roundworm | |
| gogaŋ = gugaŋ | Lepidoptera | | generic |
| gogiben | Piper celtidiforme | | |
| gojagen | Curcuma longa | | |
| gojmet, salkay | Etlingera sp. | | |
| golbd mñ | Pandorea pandorana | | |
| golŋ | Daphniphyllum papuanum | | |
| golyad | Melidectes torquatus | cinnamon-breasted wattle bird | |
| goñbl | Rorippa schlechteri | | |
| goñbl, goñbl gtan | Brassica napus | | |
| goñŋn | Breynia collaris | | |
| goñŋn, goñŋn mseŋ-ket | Colubrina sp. | | |
| goyaŋ | Geitonoplesium cymosum | | |
| goym, jamay, juk | Araucaria sp. | | |
| gtkep, as gtkep | Pogonomys sylvestris, Paramelomys rubex | lesser prehensile-tailed rat | |
| gtkep, kamay gtkep, mes, mes tud | Pittosporum spp. | | |
| gtkep, mes gtkep | Timonius belensis | | |
| gubodm | Ficus eustephana | | |
| gugolŋ | Riedelia geluensis | | |
| gugubay | Cypholophus sp., Solanum sp. | | |
| gulbalk, m aydk, sanp | Colocasia esculenta | taro, wild | |
| gulgul, galkneŋ | Epimachus fastosus | black sicklebill | |
| gulgul, kalaj | | greater sicklebill | male |
| gul-ws | | field cricket | |
| gumdoŋ = gmdoŋ | Ficus gracillima, Ficus pantoniana, Ficus subulata | | |
| gumgum | Probosciger aterrimus | palm cockatoo | |
| gumon | Fagraea amabilis | | |
| gumon pidol | Corynocarpus cribbianus | | |
| guŋ, nogob | Pipturus sp. or spp. | | |
| gupñ | Homalanthus nervosus | | |
| gupñ kasp | Homalanthus novoguineensis | | |
| gupñ, gupñ gapnay, gupñ kasp, kamay gupñ | Homalanthus spp. | | |
| gupñ-magi-ket | | mottled whistler | |
| gusal = gusay | Dodonaea viscosa | | |
| jaj | Diplazium asperum | | |
| jamad = jmad | Gardenia lamingtonii | | |
| jbjel | | lesser sicklebill | |
| jbjel, galkneŋ | Epimachus meyeri | Meyer's sicklebill | |
| jbnog | Hemigraphis sp. | | |
| jbnog, jbog | Phyllanthus sp. | | |
| jbog, kdkd | Charmosyna pulchella | little red lory | |
| jeŋn | Streblus spp., Streblus glaber, Streblus urophyllus | | |
| jeptpt, jeptpt-nap | Eugerygone rubra | fidgeting flycatcher | |
| jes | Commersonia bartromania | | |
| jjabi | Adenostemma viscosum | | |
| jjak, kmn jsp, kmn | Glomera sp. | | |
| jjb | Dendrobium sp. | | |
| jjelŋ | Decaspermum bracteatum, Myrtaceae sp. or spp. | | |
| jjgayaŋ, kotleg | Grallina bruijni | torrent lark, magpie lark | |
| jjoj, sataw | | death adder | |
| jlgol, jjgol | Schoenus sp., Scirpus sp., Scleria sp. | | |
| jlgu | Semecarpus sp. | | |
| jlgu, jlgol | Carex sp. or spp. | | |
| jm, kalap jm | Dacrydium novo-guineense | New Guinea rimu | |
| jm, kalap jm, mon jm | Gymnostoma papuanum | | |
| jmad | | green tree python | |
| jnal, pkay, wsnaŋ | Alphitonia spp. | | |
| jobol, jogob, wonm | Eurya tigang | | |
| jogal | Angiopteris erecta | | |
| jogal, kamay jogal | Marattia werneri | | |
| jolbeg | | fantail | generic |
| jolbeg | Rhipidura atra | black fantail | |
| jolbeg mosb | Rhipidura atra | black fantail | adult male |
| jolbeg, (K) jolbeg pk, (G) jolbeg pok | Rhipidura brachyrhyncha | rufous fantail | |
| joli | Tanysiptera galatea | racquet-tailed kingfisher | |
| joŋ | | crickets | generic, including most Orthoptera |
| jop | Artabotrys vriesianus, Elaeagnus triflora | | |
| jsp | Arthraxon ciliaris, Eragrostis brownii, Garnotia sp. | | |
| jsp, kmn, kmn jsp | Mediocalcar spp. | | |
| kabacp | Dendrolagus sp. | tree kangaroo | |
| kabapk | | bird-catching spider | |
| kabay bl, kabay albad, kabay cgaŋ | | superb bird-of-paradise | adult male |
| kabay bl, kabay cgaŋ, kabay kl | Lophorina superba | superb bird-of-paradise | |
| kabay mosb, kabay gs, kabay kawslwog, kabay mosaj, kabay sbtkep | Cnemophilus loriae | Loria's bird-of-paradise | |
| kabay pk, kabay pk mluksu | | six-plumed bird-of-paradise | female and immature males |
| kabay wog-dep | Parotia lawesii | | |
| kabi | Lithocarpus sp. or spp. | | |
| kabkal, maklek | Uromys caudimaculatus | lowland giant tree rat | |
| kablamneŋ, kmn-bl, kmn-wm | | king parrot | |
| kabpet, kuyŋ kabpet; ŋetŋet | Coturnix chinensis | king quail | |
| kackac | Artamus maximus | woodswallow, tree swallow | |
| kadŋ kl | | shield spider | |
| kadŋ, kadŋ kl, kl, sugulbeñ, wad-kl | | orb-weaver spiders | |
| kaganm | Corvus tristis | bare-faced crow | |
| kagap, pagap | Phaseolus lunatus | lima bean | |
| kaj yglu | Ophiuros exaltatus | | |
| kaj-kut | Ficus adenosperma, Ficus erythrosperma | | |
| kaj-meg, (K) kosod-yakt, (G) kosad yakt | Cisticola exilis | tailorbird | |
| kaj-pab, pab | Broussonetia papyrifera | paper mulberry | |
| kaj-ypl-si-dak, koptt, yptt | Ducula zoeae | Zoe's imperial pigeon | |
| kalap db, skp | Dacrycarpus imbricatus | | |
| kalap, mabs | Casuarina oligodon | | |
| kalay | Bidens pilosa | | |
| kalom | Bixa orellana | | |
| kamay | Nothofagus pullei | | |
| kamay gupñ | Homalanthus arfakiensis | | |
| kamay mumjel | | Archbold's nightjar | |
| kamay ydlum | Nothofagus pseudoresinosa | | |
| kamay-nolb | | beech orchid | |
| kamok | Pneumatopteris papuana | | |
| kañm | Musa sp. or spp. | | |
| kañm, klwak | | Papuan lory | mature female |
| kaŋ nonm, kaŋ nop, spsp | | longicorn beetle | |
| kapi | Phragmites karka | | |
| kapi bleb | | spotless crake | |
| kapi kñopl | | snipe bird | |
| kapis | Rorippa nasturtium-aquaticum, Spinacia oleracea | | |
| kapn snm | Celosia argentea | | |
| kasan, kaskam | Arachis hypogaea | | |
| kaskam | Melicope triphylla, Melicope vitiflora, Melicope xanthoxyloides | | |
| kaskam aydk | Melicope denhamii, Melicope durifolia, Melicope trachicarpa | | |
| kaskam aydk, kaskam kuysek | Melicope aneura | | |
| kaskam mataw | Melicope pachypoda | | |
| kaskas | | greater woodswallow | |
| katgn | Rattus niobe | small mountain rat | |
| katmap | Brassica oleracea | | |
| kawen | Ipomoea alba | | |
| kawkaw | Solanum tuberosum | | |
| kawl; alu, waym | Artocarpus communis | | |
| kawseb, kawsi, kawsl | Impatiens hawkeri | | |
| kawsl-wog, kawsilog | Melampitta lugubris | black false pitta, lesser melampitta | |
| kaydok | Rhodomyrtus lanatus | | |
| kayn-sabi, sabi aydk, sabi lkañ, sabi tud, ttpak | Setaria palmifolia | | kinds |
| kayn-yng | Selaginella sp. or spp. | | |
| kayŋay, ? skp | Schefflera boridiana, Schefflera megalantha | | |
| kaywl; kalaj | Aceros plicatus | hornbill | |
| kb | Pycnopygius cinereus | grey honeyeater | |
| kb kluneŋ, kej, kojway | Meliphaga subfrenata | black-throated honeyeater | |
| kbaŋm, namluk, pok-lakep | Freycinetia sp. or spp. | | |
| kb-bokbok | Jaspinum sp. | | |
| kben, kubap kben, mnan kben | Acorus calamus | | |
| kben, mnan kben | Dianella sp. | | |
| kbogl | Glochidion novoguineense | | |
| kb-slk | Meliphaga spp. | | |
| kceki sblam, (PL) awkem | Cordyline ledermanni | | |
| kceki si, si kck | Laportea decumana | | |
| kdiplŋ | Ficus endochaete | | |
| kel | Calyptrocalyx sp. | | |
| kgomn | Blumea arnakidophora | | |
| ki, wan | Ptiloprora guisei | brown-backed streaked honeyeater | |
| kinm | Dimeria ciliata | | |
| ki-numd, gupñ-magi-ket | Pachycephala leucostigma | mottled whistler | |
| kitañ | Crassocephalum crepidioides, Erechtites valerianifolia | | |
| kiwos | Nyctimystes disruptus | | |
| kjkj | Benincasa hispida | | |
| kkask bd | Rubus rosifolius | | |
| kkask, tgos | Rubus spp. | | |
| klen | Phaseolus sp., Planchonella spp., Planchonella macropoda | | |
| klen, klen-bd | | runner bean | |
| kleykley, ytem-kleykley | Monarcha axillaris | black monarch | |
| klop | Cardamine sp. | | |
| kls | Lobulia stanleyana | | |
| klwak-db = kulwak-db | Pothos sp. | | |
| kmn gad | Sticherus pseudoscandens | | |
| kmnnumud, sñeñ skoy | | black-hooded cuckooshrike | |
| kms, kumŋañ | Caryota sp., Gronophyllum sp. or spp. | fishtail palm | |
| kñ | Stephania montana | | |
| kñes | Eleocharis attenuata | | |
| kñopl | Scolopax saturata | East Indian woodcock | |
| kob | | Papuan lory | mature |
| kob, saymon | | Papuan lory | |
| kob-bg-ket | | black kite | |
| koben | Goura victoria | Victoria crowned pigeon | |
| kobkaknaŋ | | web of tetragnathid spider | |
| kobti | Casuarius bennetti | | |
| kobti agal | Pteris tripartita | | |
| kobti gulgin | Casuarius unappendiculatus | | |
| kocb | Uncaria bernaysii | | |
| koct, koct amam, koct b-tepsek, koct btep badsek | Ptilinopus rivoli bellus | white-breasted fruit dove | |
| kodal, mglak | | millipede | |
| kodlap | Elaeocarpus womersleyi | | |
| kodojp | Elaeocarpus firmus, Elaeocarpus leucanthus | | |
| kogm | Drymaria cordata | | |
| kojam, palm | Trichosanthes pulleana | | |
| kolaleg | | water flycatcher | |
| kolem aydk, pd sgoy | Dioscorea spp. | yam | wild kinds |
| kolem, kolem aydk, kolem aydk, pd magi | Dioscorea bulbifera | | |
| kolm | Haliastur indus | brahminy kite or red-backed kite | |
| kolp | Colocasia esculenta | tuber of Colocasia esculenta | |
| komay, ymges | Dubouzetia novoguineensis | | |
| komñ | Sphenomorphus sp. | | |
| kon-kalay | Gynura procumbens | | |
| koñmay | Emilia prenanthoides, Lactuca spp., Spathoglottis sp. | | |
| koñmayd | Rhipidura leucophrys | willie wagtail | |
| koŋak | Rallicula forbesi | Forbe's chestnut rail | |
| koŋak | | crakes and rails | generic |
| koŋds | Pachycephala schlegelii, Pachycephala soror | | |
| koŋds = kods | Pachycephala | | generic |
| koŋds = kods | | Schlegel's whistler | |
| koŋds = kods | | whistler | generic |
| koŋds lkañ | | whistler | adult male |
| koŋds mseŋket | | whistler | adult female |
| koŋds todimadi, koŋds kamay-ket | Pachycephala modesta | brown-backed whistler | |
| koŋds todimadi, koŋds mseŋ-ket | Pachycephala rufiventris dorsalis | white-bellied whistler | |
| kopyak = kupyak, (PL) wŋbek-cad-nb | Rattus exulans, Rattus niobe, Rattus ruber | house rat | |
| kopyak gulbodu | Rattus ruber | garden rat | |
| kosay | Ficus pungens | | |
| koslem | Syzygium malaccense | | |
| kosp | | mountain mouse-warbler | |
| kotleg | | torrent-lark | |
| kotpek, kotpek kas-ps | Prunus grisea | | |
| kotpek, mseŋ kotpek | Prunus turneriana | | |
| kotpek, mseŋ kotpek, mslm | Polyosma sp. or spp. | | |
| koymaŋ, kpay, kpay koymaŋ | Cocos nucifera | | |
| ksks, bdoŋ | Astrapia stephaniae | | |
| kuam | Garcinia archboldiana | | |
| kubap, jejaw | Ficus microdictya | | |
| kubul | Polytoca macrophylla | | |
| kugolk | Ilex sp. | | |
| kulep, kulep acb | Aegotheles albertisi | | |
| kulmuŋ | Trema cannabina | | |
| kulŋañ | Schuurmansia henningsii | | |
| kumi, snay | Pandanus julianettii | | |
| kuñp | Trachymene arfakiensis | | |
| kuñp, kuñp kañp, kuñp sepeb, kuñp ygam, sepeb, wokd | Oenanthe javanica | | kinds |
| kuñp-yt-ps, (K) smlsmlnap, (G) ssmulnap; ssmalam | | black-breasted flatbill flycatcher | |
| kuŋb | Amblyornis macgregoriae | MacGregor's bowerbird | |
| kuŋub | Cnemophilus macgregorii | sickle-crested bird-of-paradise | |
| kuŋub = (K) kuŋb | | gardener bowerbird | |
| kuŋub lkañsek | | gardener bowerbird | mature male |
| kuŋub neb | | gardener bowerbird | female and immature male |
| kuom | | agamid lizard | |
| kuptol kuysek | Arrhenechthites novoguineensis | | |
| kutwal = kotwal | Pademelon | | |
| kutwal = kotwal | Thylogale brunii | bush wallaby, scrub wallaby | |
| kuwŋ | Synoicus ypsilophorus | swamp quail | |
| kuwt | | cuckoo-dove | |
| kuwt sapol-kod, kuwt yb | Macropygia nigrirostris | black-billed cuckoo-dove | |
| kuwt tun | Macropygia amboinensis | Amboyna cuckoo-dove | |
| kuyn | Cyathea magna | | |
| kuyn | Cyathea | | generic |
| kuyŋ | Synoicus ypsilophorus | swamp quail, brown quail | |
| kuyŋ | | quail | generic |
| kuyŋ kabpet | | button quail | |
| kuyopi = kiopi | Microsorum punctatum | | |
| kuyot = kiot | Mangifera sp. | | |
| kipep, kuypep kuykuy-sek | Hydromys shawmayeri | mountain water rat | |
| kuypep, kipep, kuypep kuykuy-sek | Crossomys moncktoni | earless water rat | |
| layon | Sechium edule | | |
| lbeñ, lbeñ kas-ps | Schizomeria clemensiae, Schizomeria gorumensis | | |
| lbg | Lanius schach | schach shrike | |
| lokañ | Pipturus argenteus | | |
| lu | Timonius morobensis | | |
| m aydk | Alocasia sp. | | |
| m, mi, (PL) alom, (PL) mukut | Colocasia esculenta | taro | generic |
| m, mi; nem, sap | Colocasia esculenta | | |
| mab-yb, monyb, ymn | Sphagnum sp. or spp. | | |
| madaw; ket-ketm, kñm | Phalanger gymnotis | ground cuscus | |
| magey, takp | | white cuscus | |
| magl-paceb | Endiandra grandifolia | | |
| maj | Ipomoea batatas | sweet potato | |
| majown | Sundacarpus amarus | | |
| mak | Metroxylon sp. | sago palm | |
| maldapan | Melanocharis versteri | fan-tailed berrypecker | |
| maldapan gs, maldapan kl | | fan-tailed berrypecker | female |
| maldapan mosb | | fan-tailed berrypecker | adult male |
| maldapan todimadi | | black berrypecker | |
| malg, ayom, aywom | Gymnophaps albertisii | mountain pigeon | |
| mamag | Solanum aviculare | | |
| mamŋ | Sphenomorphus darlingtoni | | |
| mamŋ tud | Polygonum chinense | | |
| mamŋ, mamŋ lkañ, pelŋ, tipeñ | Begonia sp. or spp. | | |
| mañmod | Prasinohaema flavipes | | |
| mayap | | tiger parrot | |
| mayap | Psittacella brehmii | Brehm's tiger parrot | |
| mayap | Psittacella madaraszi ? | Madarasz's tiger parrot | |
| maygot, ? yng-tud | Phalanger carmelitae | black mountain cuscus | |
| maykop | Dicksonia hieronymi | | |
| mem, mem aydk, mem sgi | Plectranthus spp. | | |
| mem, mem tud | Salvia sp. or spp. | | |
| memneŋ | Melipotes fumigatus | common melipotes | |
| memneŋ | Scaevola oppositifolia | | |
| meŋñ | Flindersia pimenteliana | | |
| mes | Pittosporum ramiflorum | | |
| mgoñm | Maclura cochinchinensis | | |
| mimot | | chafer beetle | |
| mkal, kubap | Aglaonema sp. or spp. | | |
| mluk-ps | | field cricket | |
| mmali | Piper sp. or spp., Piper macropiper | | |
| mmañp | Collocalia esculenta | glossy swiftlet | |
| mmañp, sskl | Collocalia hirundinacea | | |
| mñ kkask | Rubus moluccanus | | |
| mnan magi | Cypraea sp. | | |
| mnŋej | Nertera granadensis | | |
| mŋay | Ficus nodosa, Ficus variegata | | |
| molok bokad | Spiraeopsis brassii | | |
| molok kab | Acsmithia parvifolia, Pullea glabra | | |
| molok kas at-ket, molok smgep | Opocunonia nymanii | | |
| mosak | Mallomys aroaensis | | |
| mosak gam, kmn gam | Epiblastus sp. | | |
| mosak puŋ | Aristolochia sp. | | |
| mosak; aloñ, kabkal, maklek | Mallomys rothschildi | giant bamboo rat, syn. Rothschild's woolly rat | |
| mtmñ | Peperomia sp. | | |
| mug, as mug | Mammelomys lanosus | bush rat | |
| mug; moys | Melomys lorentzii, Melomys platyops | Lorentz's rat | |
| mugsi, tu-kapl, tu-meg | | bush cricket, cave cricket | |
| mum | Podargus papuensis | great Papuan frogmouth, giant frogmouth | |
| mumjel, mumjel kñŋsek | Ninox theomacha | Papuan boobook owl | |
| mumloj | Myrmecodia schlechteri | anthouse plant | |
| mumuk | Hyomys goliath | giant cane rat | |
| mumyaŋ | | spider-hunting wasp | |
| m-ypl | Mussaenda cylindrocarpa | | |
| namluk | Freycinetia bismarckensis, Freycinetia schraderensis, Freycinetia tafarensis, Freycinetia vulgaris | | |
| namluk sgaw-tud | Freycinetia rectangularis | | |
| ñay | Salvadorina waigiuensis | mountain duck, wild duck | |
| nbon, mñ-nbon | Pipturus pullei | | |
| ñgñolom | Sphenomorphus leptofasciatus | | |
| ñgog-pagog | Motacilla cinerea | grey wagtail | |
| ñg-otok | | flatworm | |
| nm | Morelia amethistina | giant python | |
| ñmeg | Diplazium decompositum | | |
| ñmlm | Equisetum debile | horsetail plant | |
| ññalu | Claoxylon spp. | | |
| ñŋay | Pueraria lobata | | |
| nol | Melidectes rufocrissalis | Reichenow's melidectes | |
| ñom pk, sin pk | Natrix mairii ? | | |
| noman, tumd | Phyllocladus hypophyllus | | |
| ñoŋud kuysek, ñoŋud kojow | Cinnamomum archboldianum | | |
| ñopd | Pteridophora alberti | | |
| ñopd kolman | | King of Saxony bird-of-paradise | mature male |
| ñopd neb | | King of Saxony bird-of-paradise | female and immature male |
| ñopd, kolman | | King of Saxony bird-of-paradise | |
| nugsum = ñgsum | Microglossa pyrifolia | | |
| ŋetŋet | | king quail | |
| ŋoŋi | | lizard, probably a gecko | |
| pakam | Peroryctes raffrayana | hunting bandicoot | |
| pd magi | Dioscorea bulbifera | tuber of Dioscorea bulbifera, aerial | |
| pelŋ | Symbegonia spp. | | |
| pelŋ, tipeñ | Begonia kanienis | | |
| peñbin, pen-ñbin, majabin, najabin | Phylloscopus trivirgatus | leaf warbler | |
| piaw, tman, tmen | Calamus sp. | lawyer cane, rattan | |
| pimakol | Lobulia elegans | | |
| pipiben | Lycopodium cernuum | | |
| pkaŋ, yabay pkaŋ | | lesser bird-of-paradise | female or immature male |
| plag | Clytoceyx rex | shovel-billed kingfisher | |
| plŋ | Peneothello cyanus | slaty thicket flycatcher | |
| plŋ, wet | | robin flycatcher | |
| plolom | Halcyon megarhyncha | mountain yellow-billed kingfisher | |
| plolom | Halcyon sancta | sacred kingfisher | |
| pluan, pulwan | Melodinus australis | | |
| pñepk | Toxorhamphus poliopterus | slaty-chinned longbill | |
| pnes | Microeca papuana | microeca flycatcher | |
| pobol | Typha orientalis | | |
| polmaŋ | Holochlamys beccarii | | |
| popo paypay | Carica papaya | pawpaw | |
| pow | Aegotheles insignia | | |
| pow | | owlet-nightjars and Archbold's nightjar | generic |
| pubnm, sbyaŋ, lum suwn | | tiger beetle | |
| pugtek | Elmerrillia papuana, Magnolia palmifolia | | |
| sabi | Setaria sp., Setaria palmifolia | | generic |
| sag | Cucumis sativus | cucumber | generic |
| sag aydk | Neoachmandra filipes, Urceodiscus belensis | | |
| sag jamay, sag tud | | cucumber | kinds |
| sagal | Alstonia macrophylla | | |
| sagal | Tyto tenebricosa | sooty owl | |
| saglom | Davallia sp. | | |
| salm | | core of mountain pandanus fruit | |
| sanp | Alocasia nicolsonii | taro, wild | |
| sapol | Macaranga strigosa | | |
| sapol semeñ-tin | Macaranga intonsa | | |
| sawey | Castanopsis acuminatissima | | |
| sawñ | Cyclosorus sp. or spp. | | |
| sbal; m kiap, kokmay, kudu | Xanthosoma sagittifolium | taro, kongkong taro | |
| sbaw | Cacomantis variolosus | grey-breasted cuckoo | |
| sbaw numud, ? sdweymadwey | Chalcites ruficollis | mountain bronze cuckoo | |
| sbaw, sbaw mseŋ-ket, kamay sbaw | Cacomantis pyrrhophanus | fan-tailed cuckoo | |
| sbaw, sbaw numd | | cuckoo | |
| sbdalem | Wikstroemia androsaemifolia | | |
| sbi, ? sgoy | Dioscorea esculenta | | |
| sbi, yaked | Phalanger sp. | | |
| sblam | Cordyline fruticosa | palm lily | |
| sblam, (PL) awkem | Cordyline | | generic |
| sbn, ? aleg | Solanum nigrum | | |
| sbos | Lycopodium sp. or spp. | club-moss | |
| sd, sud, yŋleb | Miscanthus floridulus | swordgrass | |
| señŋ | Sericornis nouhuysi | large mountain wren-warbler | |
| señŋ blwen | | ploughshare tit | male |
| señŋ mluk-su | | ploughshare tit | female and immature males |
| señŋ tmd-bad-sek, señŋ mluk-su | Eulacestoma nigropectus | ploughshare tit | |
| señŋ tmud-badsek | | ploughshare tit | adult male |
| sep | Myzomela adolphinae | | |
| sep | | myzomela and mistletoebirds | generic |
| sep bis, sep bj | | red-collared myzomela | female and immature male |
| sep kalom | | red-collared myzomela | adult male |
| sep kalom, sep bis, sep bj | Myzomela rosenbergii | red-collared myzomela | |
| sep maj-ks-ket, sep mumloj-kab-ket | | mistletoebirds | |
| sep mumlojkab-ket, sep maj-magi-ket | Dicaeum geelvinkianum | anthouse bird, mistletoebird | |
| sep-mumlojkabket | | midget flowerpecker | |
| sg | | Papuan lory, melanistic form of | |
| sgaw | | bush wallaby | |
| sgdalem | Zanthoxylum conspersipunctatum | | |
| sgoglek | Octamyrtus behrmanii | | |
| si ydmuŋ, mon ydmuŋ | Dendrocnide morobensis | | |
| si, si kck, si gidmit = si godpit, si godpl, si lkañ | Laportea | | |
| sidn | Prasinohaema prehensicauda | | |
| siŋ | Apistocalamus sp., Natrix montana ? | | |
| sj; awj, mduwn | Abelmoschus manihot | | |
| sjaŋ | Rattus verecundus | long-snouted rat | |
| sjwey, sjweywey | Gerygone cinerea, Gerygone ruficollis | gerygone tree warbler | |
| skayag | Tyto capensis | grass owl | |
| skek | Sericornis perspicillatus | buff-faced wren-warbler | |
| skek, skek kalom | | bushwren | |
| sklek | Helicia sp. or spp. | | |
| skoyd; boñay | Pseudochirulus forbesi | painted ringtail possum | |
| skp; ? kalap db | Dacrycarpus imbricatus | | |
| skub, skub goblad, bojm-pkep | Henicopernis longicauda | long-tailed honey buzzard | |
| sloj | Malurus alboscapulatus | black fairywren | |
| smlsmlnap, kuñp-ptps | Machaerirhynchus nigripectus | black-breasted flatbill flycatcher | |
| snb | Zingiber officinale | ginger | |
| sñeñ | Coracina montana | | |
| sñeñ | | cuckooshrikes | generic |
| sñeñ saki, sñeñ skoy | Coracina longicauda | black-billed cuckooshrike | |
| sñeñ swalwal, sñeñ suwalwal | Coracina caeruleogrisea | stout-billed cuckooshrike | |
| sog | Finschia spp. | | |
| sogan | Myristica subulata | | |
| som | Sphaerostephanos sp. | | |
| soy-tum | Emoia caeruleocauda | lizard found in lowlands | |
| spi | Albizia falcataria, Paraserianthes falcataria | | |
| splep | | woodworm | |
| spsep | Daphoenositta miranda | pink-faced nuthatch | |
| spsep | Micropsitta bruijnii | Salvadori mountain pygmy parrot | |
| ssabol | Carpodetus arboreus | | |
| sskl | Collocalia whiteheadi | Whitehead's swiftlet | |
| sskl | Hirundo tahitica | Pacific swallow | |
| sskl | Nothocnide melastomifolia | | |
| ssnb | Clematis papuasica | | |
| sspi | Aceratium parvifolium, Sericola micans, Sorghum nitidum | | |
| suatg | Dasyurus albopunctatus | New Guinea quoll, marsupial cat | |
| sueg | Pachycephala rufinucha | red-naped whistler | |
| sueg bulweñ, sueg bulweñsek | | shield-bill bird-of-paradise | |
| sugulbeñ | Nephila maculata | golden orb-weaver | |
| sugun | Garcinia schraderi | | |
| sukñam | Papuacedrus papuana | | |
| sulwal | Parasponia rigida | | |
| sumsum | Cercartetus caudatus | pygmy possum | |
| suosu | Macaranga rhodonema | | |
| tabal; alad, cmgan, kañm, kob, ? sg | Charmosyna papou | | phases |
| tadap | Garcinia lauterbachiana | | |
| takp | Spilocuscus maculatus | | |
| tay | | greater bird-of-paradise | |
| tbum = tubum | Schefflera simbuensis, Schefflera straminea | | |
| tdagl | Gunnera macrophylla | | |
| tgs lkañ | Acalypha sp. | | |
| tgs, tgs aygs | Acalypha hellwigii | | |
| tlum | Sloanea archboldiana, Sloanea tieghemii, Sloania aberrans | | |
| ttamañ | Elaeocarpus schlecterianus | | |
| ttmiñ | Rhipidura atra | white-eared fantail or friendly fantail | |
| ttpak | Astronia ledermannii ? | | |
| ttpel, ttpey | | mistletoe | |
| tubum | Schefflera hirsuta | | |
| tubumkab-ket | | tit berrypecker | generic |
| tubum-kab-ket | Oreocharis arfaki | | |
| tubumkabket kl | | tit berrypecker | female |
| tubumkab-ket klwak | | tit berrypecker | male |
| tubum-kab-ket nonm | Paramythia montium | mountain berrypecker | |
| tumuk-as, as tumuk-as | Lorentzimys nouhuysi | jumping tree mouse, arboreal mouse | |
| tuos = tuwos | Ipomoea indica | | |
| tuos kas ñluk, kaywos | Ipomoea cairica | | |
| tuos, tuos kas ñluk | | morning glory | |
| tuwŋ | Centropus phasianinus | pheasant coucal | |
| waknaŋ mñ | Sabia pauciflora | | |
| walcegon | | small rat, found near homesteads | |
| walgañ, walgañ kas–ps | Symplocos cochinchinensis | | |
| wal-kobneŋ | Zosterops novaeguineae | mountain white-eye | |
| walm | Croton morobensis | | |
| waln | Harmsiopanax ingens | | |
| wanay | Chisocheton tenuis | | |
| wanay kasps | Aphanamixis polystachya | | |
| wask, kamay wask | Ficus iodotricha | | |
| waym | Artocarpus incisa | | |
| waymn | Reinwardtoena reinwardtsi | great cuckoo-dove | |
| wbl; akan | | monitor lizard | |
| wcm; (K) puŋimdep, (G) puŋi-mdep; wlpog | Pseudochirops corinnae | golden ringtail possum or stationary ringtail possum | |
| wdn-ñg | Oreopsittacus arfaki | tearful lory or plum-faced lory | |
| weñgaw | Macaranga pleioneura, Macaranga pleiostemona | | |
| wet | Poecilodryas albonotata | | |
| wgi; amgln, weñem | Microperoryctes longicauda | long-tailed bandicoot | |
| wlmeñ | Saxicola caprata | pied bush chat | |
| wlmeñ saki | Peneothello sigillatus | white-winged thicket flycatcher | |
| wlmn saw | Rhamnus nepalensis | | |
| wobwob | | black-headed pitohui | |
| wogdep, kabay cgaŋ | | six-plumed bird-of-paradise | adult male |
| wogñalam | Caprimulgus macrurus | white-tailed nightjar | |
| wogu kas ñluk | Parsonsia sp. | | |
| womay | Psophocarpus tetragonolobus | | |
| wopkay | Melastoma cyanoides, Otanthera sp. | | |
| wopkay ñluk | Osbeckia chinensis | | |
| wopkay yb | Melastoma malabathrica | | |
| wopwop | Piper subpeltatum | | |
| wtay | Cacatua galerita | sulphur-crested cockatoo | |
| wtwt | Conus litteratus | circular disk of Conus litteratus shell | |
| yabagal | | lesser bird-of-paradise or yellow bird-of-paradise | |
| yabagay | | common scrubhen | |
| yabal = yabay, pkaŋ | Paradisaea minor | | |
| yabol, yabol guldak = guldak yabol | | earthworm | |
| yagad; aneŋ, kob | Pandanus conoideus | | |
| yakt-gu | Sphenostemon papuanum, Sphenostemon pauciflora | | |
| yam | Ficus stellaris | | |
| ybelŋ | Diplycosia morobeensis, Rhododendron multinervium, Vaccinium sp. | | |
| ybelŋ tud | Rhododendron vitis-idaea | | |
| ybelŋ, kamay ybelŋ | Rhododendron phaeschitum | | |
| ybug, ybug pañpañ | Acronychia montana | | |
| ydam, yawed, kapal ps | Psittrichas fulgidus | Pesquet's parrot | |
| ydmañ | Vaccinium albicans | | |
| ygesk | Buddleja asiatica | | |
| yglu | Arundinella setosa | | |
| ygu | Dryadodaphne crassa | | |
| yluŋ | Ficus trichoserasa | | |
| yman | | lice | |
| ymañŋn pl-pat | Hemiprocne mystacea | | |
| ymduŋ | Trimenia papuana | | |
| ymduŋ; bald, kagm, kas-gs, kay, tglem-tud | Pseudochirops cupreus | copper ringtail possum | |
| ymgenm = yamganm, beŋtud, gtkep | Pogonomys sylvestris | lesser prehensile-tailed rat, bush-tailed giant rat | |
| ymgenm, as ymgenm | Pogonomelomys mayeri | little ringtail possum | |
| ymgenm-tob | Pleuranthodium sp. | | |
| ymges | Elaeocarpus nubigena, Elaeocarpus polydactylus | | |
| ymges kodlap | Elaeocarpus gardneri | | |
| ymges, ksaks | Elaeocarpus altigenus ? | | |
| ymges, ymges kas ñluk, ymges kolac, ymges ksaks | Elaeocarpus sp. or spp. | | |
| yñ | | lizard | generic |
| yñ km, yñ sidn km | Scincella prehensicauda | | |
| yokal | Galbulimima belgraveana | | |
| yow | Olearia platophylla | | |
| yppok | | woodlice | |
| yuak | Philemon novaeguineae | friarbird | |

Abbreviations:
- (G) = the Ti mnm dialect of Kalam, as spoken by the Gobnem and Skow local groups, Upper Kaironk Valley
- (K) = the Etp mnm dialect of Kalam, as spoken by the Kaytog (Kaironk) local group, Upper Kaironk Valley
- (PL) = plural

== Semantics ==
=== Colors ===
Kalam speakers distinguish more than a dozen colour categories.

- tud 'white, light coloured'
- sum 'grey, esp. of hair'
- tun 'light grey; ash'
- mosb 'black, dark coloured'
- lkañ 'red/purple; blood'
- pk 'orange/bright reddish-brown/bright yellowish-brown/rich yellow; ripe'
- sml 'rather bright red-brown/yellow brown'
- waln 'yellow'
- mjkmab 'green'
- ksk 'pale green, yellow-green; unripe (of fruit)'
- lban 'rich green, sheeny; succulent or mature (of foliage)'
- gs 'dull brown, green or olive'
- mlp 'straw coloured; withered (of foliage)'
- muk 'blue'
- sŋak 'blue-grey, as blue-grey clay'
- kl 'striped, spotted, mottled'

=== Time ===
Pawley & Bulmer (2011), quoted in Pawley and Hammarström (2018), lists the following temporal adverbs in Kalam.

- mñi 'today'
- toy 'tomorrow'
- (toy) menk 'day after tomorrow'
- toytk 'yesterday'
- menk atk 'day before yesterday'
- goson '3 days from today'
- goson atk '3 days ago'
- ason '4 days from today'
- ason atk '4 days ago'
- goson ason '5 days from today'
- goson ason atk '5 days ago'

== Morphology ==
=== Rhyming compounds ===
Kalam, like English, has different types of rhyming compounds.

alternating consonants

- gadal-badal [ŋgándálmbándál] 'placed in a disorderly manner, criss-cross, higgledy-piggledy'
- gley-wley [ŋgɨléywuléy] 'rattling, clattering'

addition of consonants

- adk-madk [ándɨkmándɨk] 'turned over, reversed'
- ask-mask [ásɨkmásɨk] 'ritually restricted'

alternating vowels

- ñugl-ñagl [ɲúŋgɨlɲáŋgɨl] 'sound of evening chorus of insects and frogs'
- gtiŋ-gtoŋ [ŋgɨríŋgɨróŋ] 'loud noise, din, racket'

== See also ==
- Ralph Bulmer
- Ian Saem Majnep
