= Choerophryne variegata =

Conservation status
- Data Deficient (IUCN 3.1)

Scientific classification
- Kingdom: Animalia
- Phylum: Chordata
- Class: Amphibia
- Order: Anura
- Family: Microhylidae
- Genus: Choerophryne
- Species: C. variegata

Binomial name
- Choerophryne variegata (Van Kampen, 1923)

Synonyms
- Hylophorbus variegatus van Kampen, 1923; Phrynomantis variegatus (van Kampen, 1923); Cophixalus variegatus (van Kampen, 1923); Albericus variegatus (van Kampen, 1923)

Species of frog

Choerophryne variegata is a species of frog in the family Microhylidae. It is endemic to West Papua, Indonesia, and is only known with certainty from its type locality, Digul River. It is assumed that most records from elsewhere refer to other, possibly undescribed species. As the species is only known from one specimen from its vaguely stated type locality, its ecology is essentially unknown, although it is presumed to be a rainforest inhabitant. No other specimen has been collected anywhere near the type locality. Despite all this, vernacular name common rainforest frog has been coined for it.

== Names ==
It is known as lk [lɨk] in the Kalam language of Papua New Guinea, a name that is also sometimes applied to immature Cophixalus parkeri, which has overlapping morphology and habitats with Choerophryne variegata.

Cophixalus shellyi, Choerophryne darlingtoni, and Oxydactyla brevicrus also tend to be identified by Kalam speakers as lk if calling from low vegetation, but as gwnm (usually applied to Cophixalus riparius and Xenorhina rostrata) if found in daytime hiding spots.

== Description ==
The holotype is an adult female with half-developed ova, measuring 17.4 mm (0.69 in) in snout–urostyle length. The snout is rounded truncate in dorsal view but projecting in profile. The arms are relatively short while the legs are relatively long. There is some basal webbing between the toes 4 and 5. The finger and toes disks are large and truncate.
