= Emoia pallidiceps =

Conservation status
- Least Concern (IUCN 3.1)

Scientific classification
- Kingdom: Animalia
- Phylum: Chordata
- Class: Reptilia
- Order: Squamata
- Suborder: Scinciformata
- Infraorder: Scincomorpha
- Family: Eugongylidae
- Genus: Emoia
- Species: E. pallidiceps

Binomial name
- Emoia pallidiceps (De Vis, 1890)

Species of lizard

Emoia pallidiceps, De Vis's emo skink, is a species of skink. It is found in New Guinea and the Bismarck Archipelago.

== Names ==
It is known as mas in the Kalam language of Papua New Guinea, a name also applied to Emoia baudini.
