= Sphenomorphus leptofasciatus =

Conservation status
- Least Concern (IUCN 3.1)

Scientific classification
- Kingdom: Animalia
- Phylum: Chordata
- Class: Reptilia
- Order: Squamata
- Family: Scincidae
- Genus: Sphenomorphus
- Species: S. leptofasciatus

Binomial name
- Sphenomorphus leptofasciatus Greer & Parker, 1974

Species of lizard

Sphenomorphus leptofasciatus is a species of skink. It is found in Papua New Guinea.

Sphenomorphus leptofasciatus is often found in or under decaying foliage and logs. It is the only skink species that the Kalam people of Papua New Guinea do not consume, although the Kalam frequently consume other skink species.

== Names ==
It is known as ñgñolom in the Kalam language of Papua New Guinea.
