= Giant naked-tailed rat =

Conservation status
- Least Concern (IUCN 3.1)

Scientific classification
- Kingdom: Animalia
- Phylum: Chordata
- Class: Mammalia
- Order: Rodentia
- Family: Muridae
- Genus: Uromys
- Species: U. anak

Binomial name
- Uromys anak Thomas, 1907

Species of rodent

The giant naked-tailed rat (Uromys anak) is a species of rodent in the family Muridae. It is found in West Papua, Indonesia and Papua New Guinea. It lives in tropical forests, wetlands, and in degraded forests.

== Names ==
It is known as abben in the Kalam language of Papua New Guinea.

== Description ==
The rodents reach a body length of up to 20–34 cm, with another added 23–38 cm for its tail. It weighs between 350 and 1020 grams. Its fur is typically short and rough, varying in colour from grey to various shades of brown and black, with its underside being white or grey. Its tail is longer than its body and is uniformly black, with the basal part densely covered with reddish hairs.

== Ecology ==
The species has been known to eat karuka nuts (Pandanus julianettii), and growers will put platforms or other obstacles on the trunks of the trees to keep the pests out.
