= Sphenomorphus darlingtoni =

Conservation status
- Least Concern (IUCN 3.1)

Scientific classification
- Kingdom: Animalia
- Phylum: Chordata
- Class: Reptilia
- Order: Squamata
- Family: Scincidae
- Genus: Sphenomorphus
- Species: S. darlingtoni

Binomial name
- Sphenomorphus darlingtoni (Loveridge, 1945)

Synonyms
- Tropidophorus darlingtoni Loveridge, 1945; Sphenomorphus darlingtoni — Greer & Parker, 1967

Species of lizard

Sphenomorphus darlingtoni is a species of skink, a lizard in the family Scincidae. The species is endemic to Papua New Guinea.

== Etymology ==
The specific name, darlingtoni, is in honor of American entomologist Philip Jackson Darlington Jr.

== Common name ==
S. darlingtoni is known as mamng in the Kalam language of Papua New Guinea. This common name is also applied to plants of the genus Begonia.

== Behavior and habitat ==
The Kalam people of Papua New Guinea describe S. darlingtoni as a slow-moving lizard that does not escape when caught, and also does not bask in the sun. It prefers damp habitats and is often found in areas of Ischaemum polystachyum grass. S. darlingtoni is fossorial, and has been found in montane rainforest, at altitudes of 1,524–1,829 m (5,000–6,001 ft).

== Reproduction ==
S. darlingtoni is oviparous.
