= Lobulia elegans =

Conservation status
- Least Concern (IUCN 3.1)

Scientific classification
- Kingdom: Animalia
- Phylum: Chordata
- Class: Reptilia
- Order: Squamata
- Family: Scincidae
- Genus: Lobulia
- Species: L. elegans

Binomial name
- Lobulia elegans (Boulenger, 1897)

Species of lizard

Lobulia elegans, the elegant lobulia, is a species of skink found in New Guinea.

It has a distinct geometric checkerboard pattern on its back.

== Names ==
It is known as pymakol in the Kalam language of Papua New Guinea.

== Habitat ==
Lobulia elegans is often found in Nothofagus beech trees at higher altitudes, as well as in gardens and clearings at lower altitudes.
