= Papuascincus stanleyanus =

Conservation status
- Least Concern (IUCN 3.1)

Scientific classification
- Kingdom: Animalia
- Phylum: Chordata
- Class: Reptilia
- Order: Squamata
- Family: Scincidae
- Genus: Papuascincus
- Species: P. stanleyanus

Binomial name
- Papuascincus stanleyanus (Boulenger, 1897)

Synonyms
- Lygosoma stanleyanum Boulenger, 1897; Lygosoma (Leiolopisma) stanleyanum — M.A. Smith, 1937; Lobulia stanleyana — Greer, 1974; Papuascincus stanleyanus — Allison & Greer, 1986

Species of lizard

Papuascincus stanleyanus is a species of skink, a lizard in the family Scincidae. The species is endemic to New Guinea.

== Etymology ==
The specific name, stanleyanus, refers to the Owen Stanley Range.

== Foreign language common names ==
P. stanleyanus is known as kls or mabdagol in the Kalam language of Papua New Guinea.

== Habitat ==
Papuascincus stanleyanus is commensal with humans, and is often found in human settlements. In the Upper Kaironk Valley of Madang Province, Papua New Guinea, it is the most common small lizard found in houses.

== Reproduction ==
C. stanleyanus is oviparous.
