= Squirrel-toothed rat =

Squirrel-toothed rat Temporal range: Pleistocene to Recent

Conservation status
- Least Concern (IUCN 3.1)

Scientific classification
- Kingdom: Animalia
- Phylum: Chordata
- Class: Mammalia
- Order: Rodentia
- Family: Muridae
- Tribe: Hydromyini
- Genus: Anisomys; Thomas, 1904
- Species: A. imitator

Binomial name
- Anisomys imitator Thomas, 1904

Species of rodent

The squirrel-toothed rat (Anisomys imitator), also known as the New Guinea giant rat, powerful-toothed rat, uneven-toothed rat, or narrow-toothed giant rat, is a species of rodent in the family Muridae. It is the only species in the genus Anisomys and is found in New Guinea.

The species has been known to eat karuka nuts (Pandanus julianettii), and growers will put platforms or other obstacles on the trunks of the trees to keep the pests out.

== Names ==
It is known as gudi-ws or gudl-ws in the Kalam language of Papua New Guinea.
