= Lorentz's mosaic-tailed rat =

Conservation status
- Least Concern (IUCN 3.1)

Scientific classification
- Domain: Eukaryota
- Kingdom: Animalia
- Phylum: Chordata
- Class: Mammalia
- Order: Rodentia
- Family: Muridae
- Genus: Paramelomys
- Species: P. lorentzii

Binomial name
- Paramelomys lorentzii (Jentink, 1908)

Species of rodent

Lorentz's mosaic-tailed rat (Paramelomys lorentzii) is a species of rodent in the family Muridae. It is found in West Papua, Indonesia and Papua New Guinea. The rat is named after Hendrikus Albertus Lorentz, a Dutch explorer who passed through Lorentz National Park on his 1909–10 expedition.

According to the Kalam people of Madang Province, Papua New Guinea, it helps spread karuka seeds.

== Names ==
It is known as mug or moys in the Kalam language of Papua New Guinea.
