= Sphenomorphus jobiensis =

Conservation status
- Least Concern (IUCN 3.1)

Scientific classification
- Kingdom: Animalia
- Phylum: Chordata
- Class: Reptilia
- Order: Squamata
- Suborder: Scinciformata
- Infraorder: Scincomorpha
- Family: Sphenomorphidae
- Genus: Sphenomorphus
- Species: S. jobiensis

Binomial name
- Sphenomorphus jobiensis Meyer, 1874

Species of lizard

Sphenomorphus jobiensis is a species of skink. It is found in New Guinea, the Admiralty Islands, Bismarck Archipelago, and eastern Indonesia (Misool, Salawati, Aru Islands, and Yapen).

== Names ==
It is known as komñ in the Kalam language of Papua New Guinea.

== Habitat and behavior ==
Sphenomorphus jobiensis is a terrestrial skink found in forest habitats. It is a relatively large skink that is fast-moving and difficult to catch, and often bites when handled.
