= Sphenophryne brevicrus =

Conservation status
- Least Concern (IUCN 3.1)

Scientific classification
- Kingdom: Animalia
- Phylum: Chordata
- Class: Amphibia
- Order: Anura
- Family: Microhylidae
- Genus: Sphenophryne
- Species: S. brevicrus

Binomial name
- Sphenophryne brevicrus (van Kampen, 1913)

Synonyms
- Oxydactyla brevicrus van Kampen, 1913

Species of frog

Sphenophryne brevicrus is a species of frog in the family Microhylidae. It is endemic to West Papua, Indonesia. Its natural habitat is subtropical or tropical moist montane forests.

== Names ==
It is known as kabanm in the Kalam language of Papua New Guinea, a name that is sometimes also applied to mature Cophixalus parkeri and Nyctimystes sp.
