= New Guinea waterside rat =

Conservation status
- Least Concern (IUCN 3.1)

Scientific classification
- Kingdom: Animalia
- Phylum: Chordata
- Class: Mammalia
- Order: Rodentia
- Family: Muridae
- Subfamily: Murinae
- Tribe: Hydromyini
- Genus: Parahydromys; Poche, 1906
- Species: P. asper

Binomial name
- Parahydromys asper (Thomas, 1906)
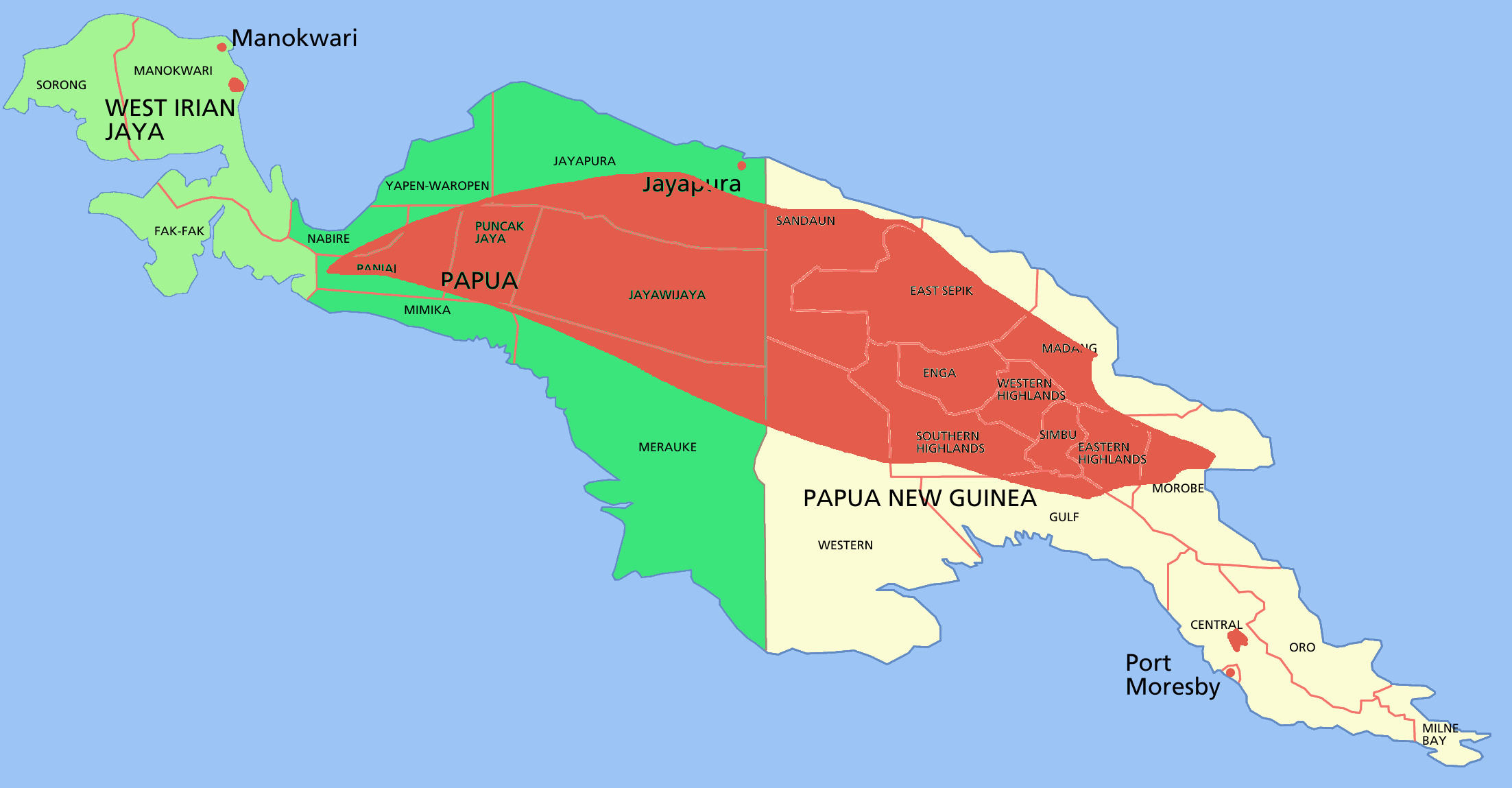
- Distribution map on New Guinea

Species of rodent

The New Guinea waterside rat (Parahydromys asper) is the only species in the genus Parahydromys. It is considered part of the New Guinea Old Endemics, meaning its ancestors were part of the first wave of murine rodents to colonize the island. It is commonly called the "Guinea rat".

== Names ==
It is known as godmg or nyabap in the Kalam language of Papua New Guinea.
