= Cuckoo-dove =

Cuckoo-dove may refer to a bird in one of three genera in the pigeon and dove family Columbidae:

- Macropygia
- Reinwardtoena
- Turacoena
