= Emoia baudini =

Conservation status
- Least Concern (IUCN 3.1)

Scientific classification
- Kingdom: Animalia
- Phylum: Chordata
- Class: Reptilia
- Order: Squamata
- Family: Scincidae
- Genus: Emoia
- Species: E. baudini

Binomial name
- Emoia baudini (A.M.C. Duméril & Bibron, 1839)

Synonyms
- Gongylus (Eumeces) baudinii A.M.C. Duméril & Bibron, 1839; Mabouya baudinii — Gray, 1845; Lygosoma baudinii — Boulenger, 1887; Emoia baudinii — Barbour, 1912; Emoia baudini — M.A. Smith, 1937

Species of lizard

Emoia baudini, also known commonly as Baudin's emo skink, Baudin's skink, and the Great Bight cool-skink, is a species of lizard in the family Scincidae. The species is native to New Guinea, Maluku, and Sulawesi.

== Etymology ==
The specific name, baudini, is in honour of French explorer Nicolas Baudin.

== Common names ==
In addition to the above English common names, E. baudini is known as mas in the Kalam language of Papua New Guinea.

== Habitat ==
The preferred natural habitat of E. baudini is forest.

== Reproduction ==
E. baudini is viviparous.
