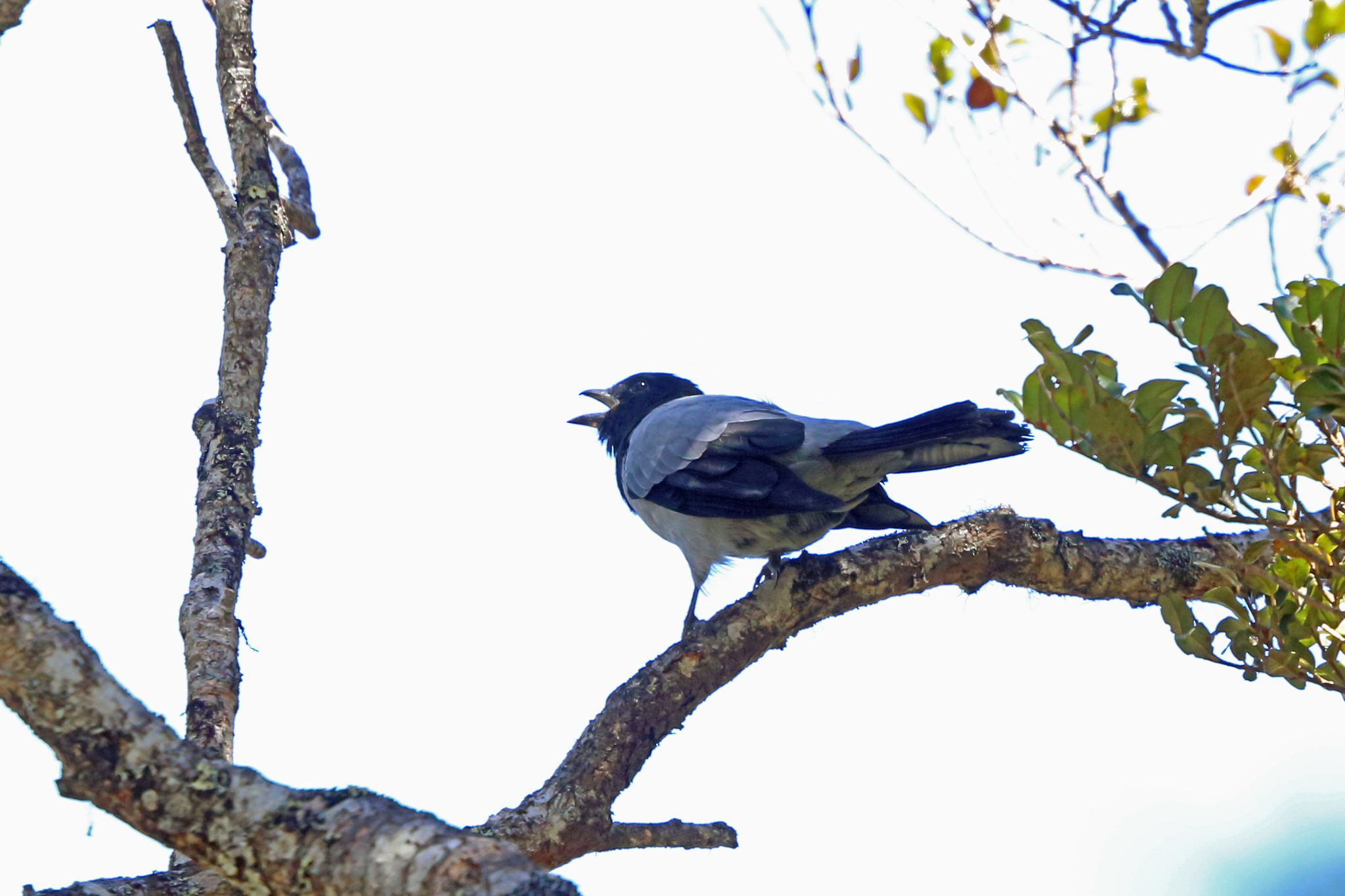

Conservation status
- Least Concern (IUCN 3.1)

Scientific classification
- Kingdom: Animalia
- Phylum: Chordata
- Class: Aves
- Order: Passeriformes
- Family: Campephagidae
- Genus: Coracina
- Species: C. longicauda

Binomial name
- Coracina longicauda (De Vis, 1890)

= Hooded cuckooshrike =

Species of bird

The hooded cuckooshrike (Coracina longicauda) is a species of bird in the family Campephagidae. It is found in the New Guinea Highlands.

Its natural habitat is subtropical or tropical moist montane forest.
