= Cophixalus parkeri =

Conservation status
- Least Concern (IUCN 3.1)

Scientific classification
- Kingdom: Animalia
- Phylum: Chordata
- Class: Amphibia
- Order: Anura
- Family: Microhylidae
- Genus: Cophixalus
- Species: C. parkeri

Binomial name
- Cophixalus parkeri Loveridge, 1948

Synonyms
- Cophixalus variegatus parkeri Loveridge, 1948

Species of frog

Cophixalus parkeri is a species of frog in the family Microhylidae. It is endemic to Papua New Guinea where it occurs in the central mountainous region between Chimbu and Morobe Provinces. The specific name parkeri presumably honours Hampton Wildman Parker, an English zoologist and herpetologist to whose perusal Arthur Loveridge sent the holotype. Common name Papua rainforest frog has been coined for it.

== Names ==
In the Kalam language of Papua New Guinea, mature C. parkeri are known as kabanm, while immature specimens are called lk [lɨk].

== Description ==
Maximum snout–vent length is 31 mm (1.2 in). The snout is slightly prominent and obtusely pointed. The tympanum is distinct and about half the diameter of the eye. The canthus rostralis is angular. Fingers have large discs whereas toes have slightly smaller discs; the toes are unwebbed. Skin is smooth with scattered tubercles. The holotype has a pale, broad interocular band, but the majority of specimens do not show this. Most specimens do not have distinct dorsal patterns but have a dark brown dorsum that grades rather abruptly into the pale reddish tan flanks. The lower parts are usually mottled with dark gray on a light tan background, but can occasionally be nearly uniform. Males have a median subgular vocal sac.

The male advertisement call is a group of short buzzing notes (usually four).

== Habitat and conservation ==
Cophixalus parkeri inhabits montane rainforest and forest edges at elevations of 2,200–2,650 m (7,220–8,690 ft) above sea level. It occurs in vegetation up to one metre above ground at night and in leaf litter during the daytime. Reproduction is through direct development (no free-living larval stage).

This species is distributed in a remote area where it is unlikely to be threatened. It is not known to be present in any protected areas.
