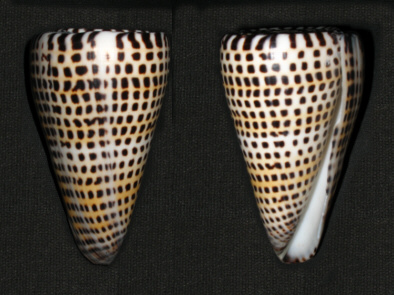
- Two views of a shell of Conus litteratus

Conservation status
- Least Concern (IUCN 3.1)

Scientific classification
- Kingdom: Animalia
- Phylum: Mollusca
- Class: Gastropoda
- Subclass: Caenogastropoda
- Order: Neogastropoda
- Superfamily: Conoidea
- Family: Conidae
- Genus: Conus
- Species: C. litteratus

Binomial name
- Conus litteratus Linnaeus, 1758

Synonyms
- Conus (Elisaconus) litteratus Linnaeus, 1758 · accepted, alternate representation; Conus arabicus Lamarck, 1810; Conus grueneri Reeve, 1844; Cucullus pardus Röding, 1798; Elisaconus litteratus (Linnaeus, 1758); Strategoconus litteratus (Linnaeus, 1758)

= Conus litteratus =

Species of sea snail

Conus litteratus, common name the lettered cone, is a species of sophisticated predatory sea snail, a marine gastropod mollusk in the family Conidae, the cone snail, cone shells or cones.

Like all species within the genus Conus, these snails are predatory and venomous. They are capable of stinging humans, therefore live ones should be handled carefully or not at all.

== Description ==
The size of the shell varies between 24 mm and 186 mm. The thick, heavy shell has a flat spire. Its color is cream with 2-3 axial bands of yellow or orange bands dotted with black.

== Habitat ==
It can be found in sand in and among coral in shallow water.

== Distribution ==
This is a widespread Indo-Pacific species, occurring in the Indian Ocean off Tanzania, Madagascar, the Mascarene Basin.

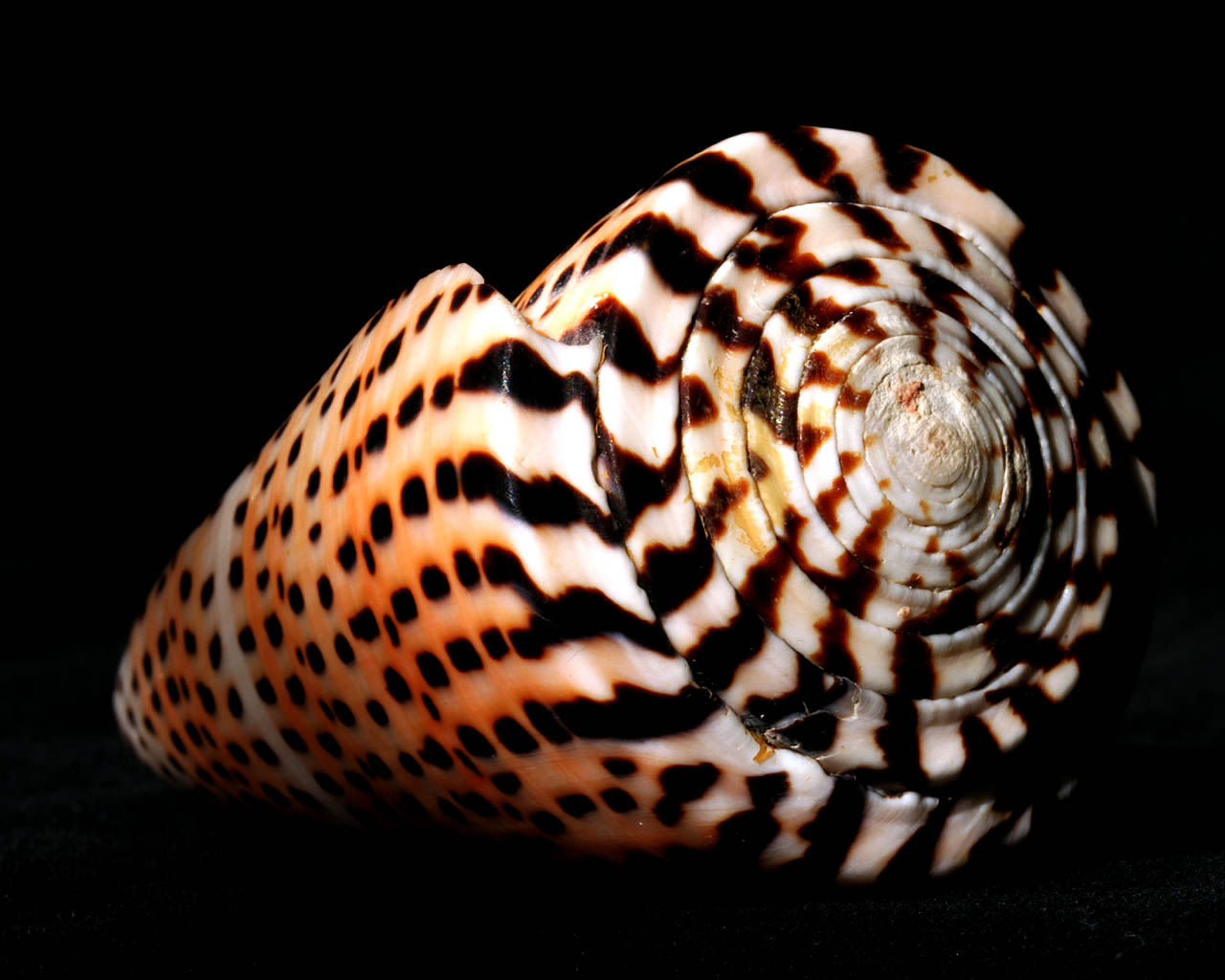
Apical view of a shell of Conus litteratus

== Life habits ==
This cone species hunts and eats marine worms.

== Gallery ==
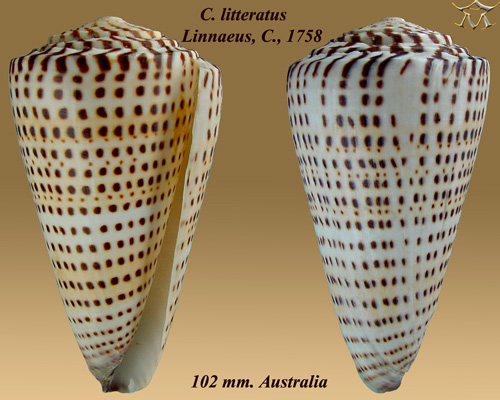
102 mm, Australia

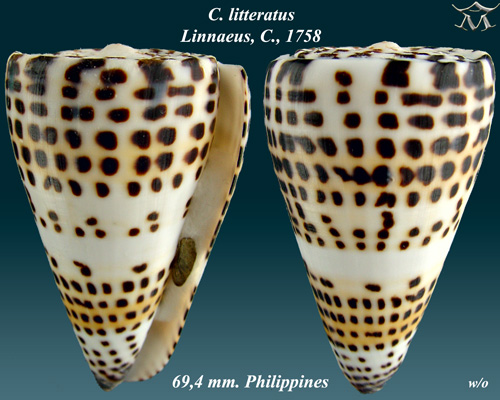
69.4 mm, Philippines

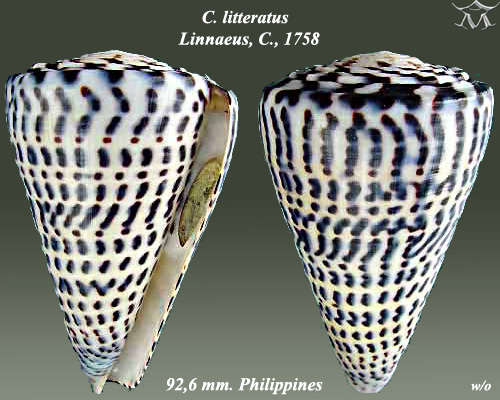
92.6 mm, Philippines
