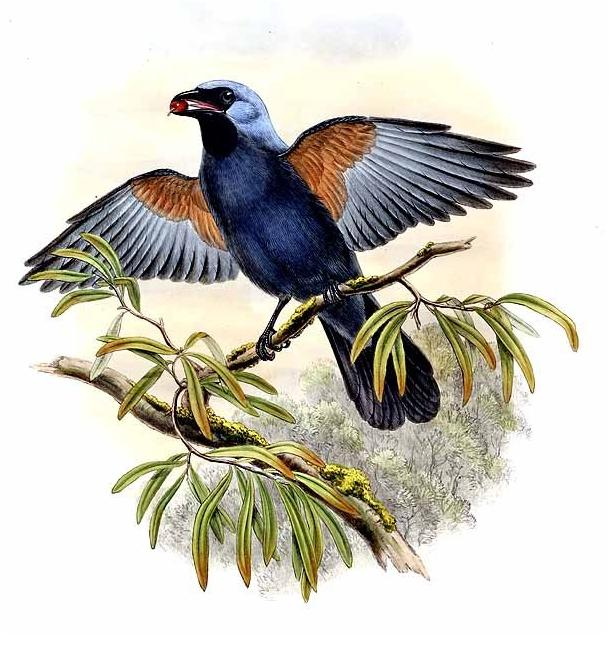

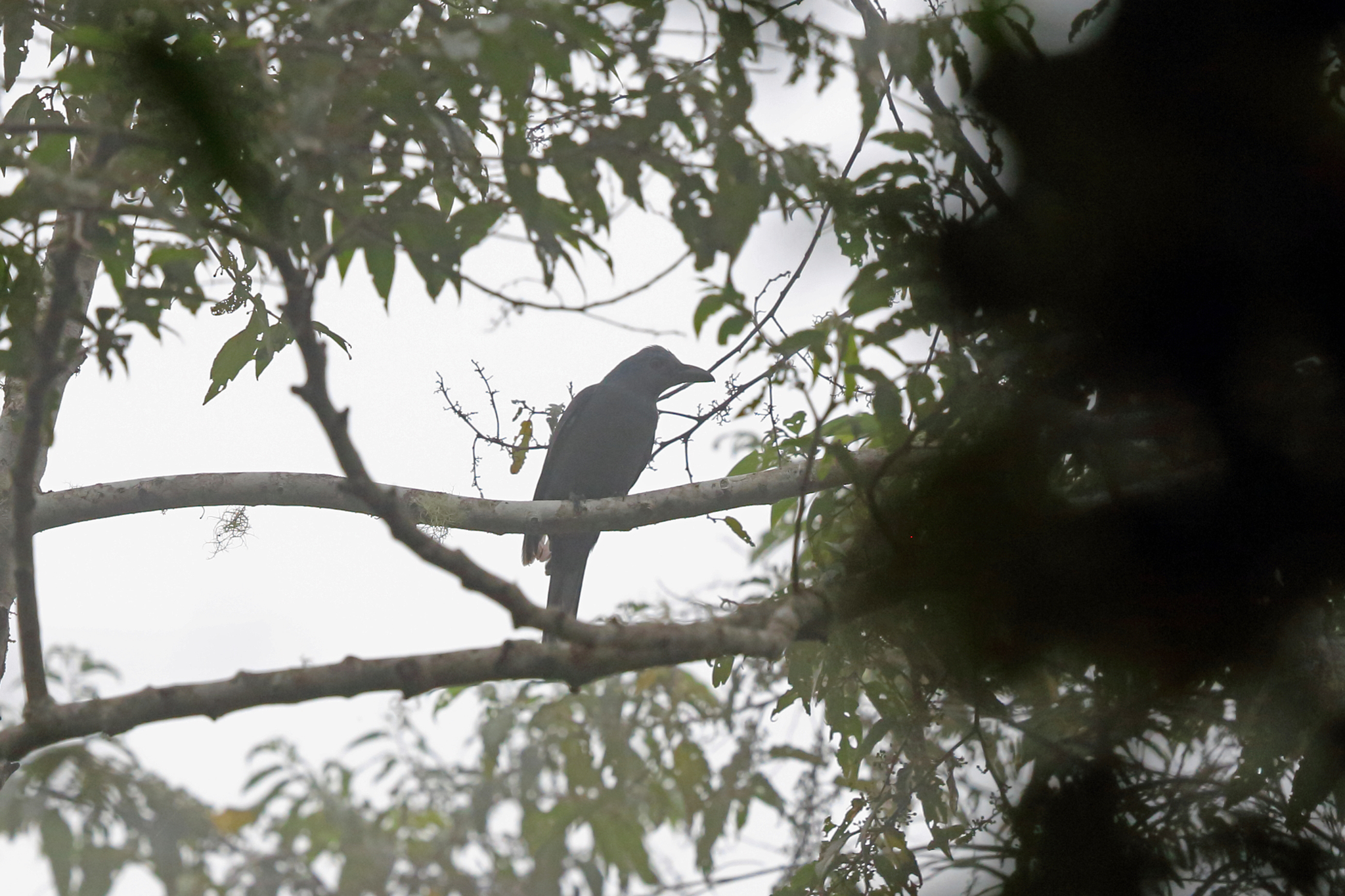

Conservation status
- Least Concern (IUCN 3.1)

Scientific classification
- Kingdom: Animalia
- Phylum: Chordata
- Class: Aves
- Order: Passeriformes
- Family: Campephagidae
- Genus: Coracina
- Species: C. caeruleogrisea

Binomial name
- Coracina caeruleogrisea (Gray, 1858)

= Stout-billed cuckooshrike =

Species of bird

The stout-billed cuckooshrike (Coracina caeruleogrisea) is a species of bird in the family Campephagidae. It is found in the Aru Islands and New Guinea. Its natural habitats are subtropical or tropical moist lowland forest and subtropical or tropical moist montane forest.
