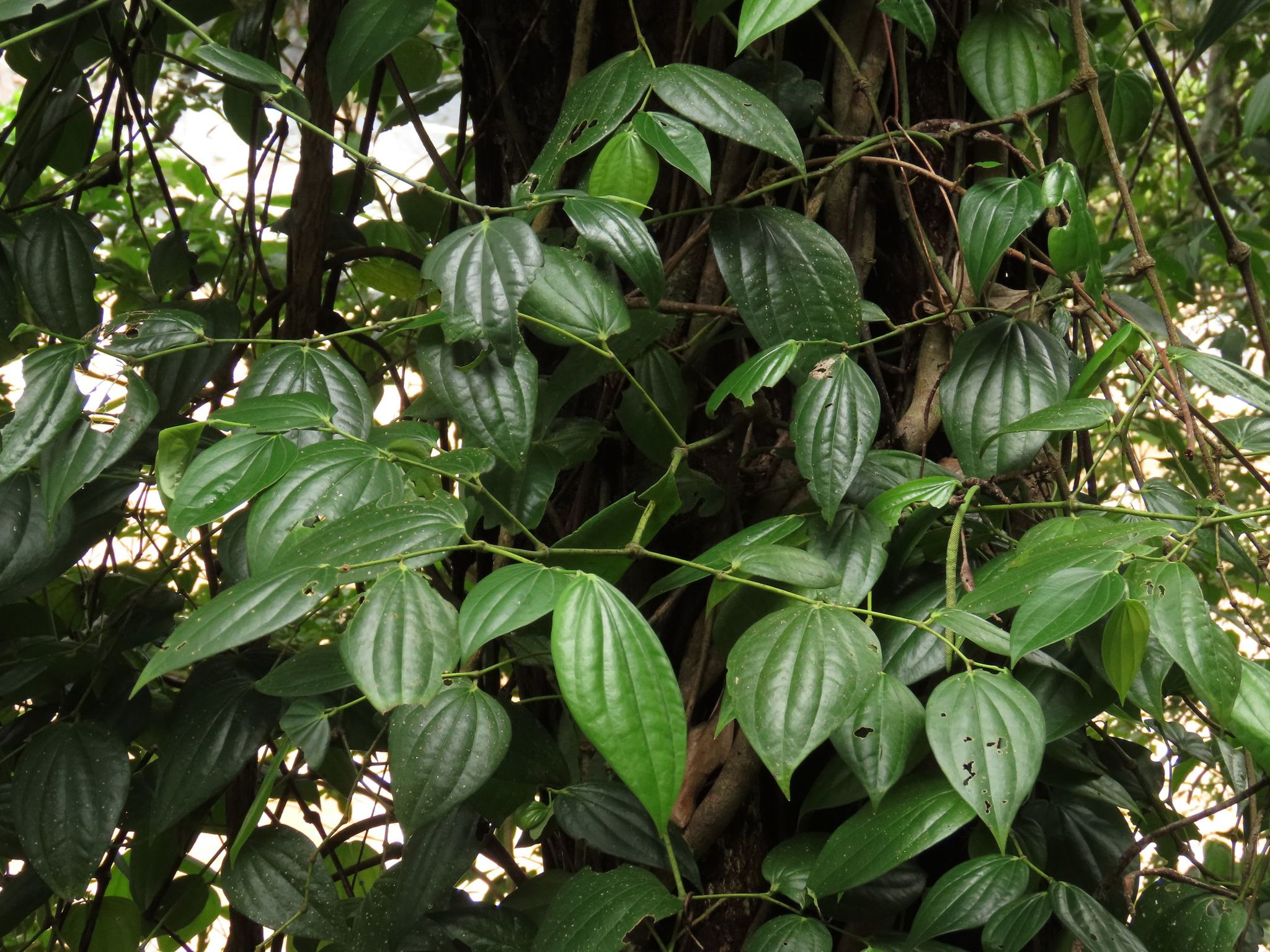
- In the Barron Gorge near Cairns, Queensland

Conservation status
- Least Concern (NCA)

Scientific classification
- Kingdom: Plantae
- Clade: Embryophytes
- Clade: Tracheophytes
- Clade: Spermatophytes
- Clade: Angiosperms
- Clade: Magnoliids
- Order: Piperales
- Family: Piperaceae
- Genus: Piper
- Species: P. macropiper

Binomial name
- Piper macropiper Pennant

Synonyms
- 40 synonyms: for Piper macropiper; Piper arborescens Roxb.; for P. m. var. macropiper; Chavica glandulosa (Opiz) C.Presl; Chavica lanceolata Miq.; Chavica macrostachya Miq.; Chavica miniata (Blume) Miq.; Chavica miniata var. hirtella Miq.; Chavica penangensis Miq.; Cubeba auriculata (Blume) Miq.; Cubeba miniata (Blume) Miq.; Piper arborescens Wall.; Piper arborescens var. angustilimbum Quisumb.; Piper auriculatum Blume; Piper boehmeriifolium var. tenuifolium C.DC.; Piper breviantherum C.DC.; Piper canaliculatum Klotzsch ex Miq.; Piper glandulosum Opiz; Piper graeffei Warb.; Piper graeffei var. cordatum Warb.; Piper kotoense Yamam.; Piper lanceolatum Roxb.; Piper linkii Miq.; Piper lonchites Schult.; Piper longipedunculatum C.DC.; Piper magnispicum C.DC.; Piper miniatum Blume; Piper miniatum var. brevispicatum C.DC.; Piper miniatum var. hirtellum (Miq.) C.DC.; Piper moluccanum Spreng.; Piper novoguineense Warb.; Piper pilipes C.DC.; Piper pubipetiolum C.DC.; Piper rodatzii K.Schum. & Lauterb.; Piper rothianum F.M.Bailey; Piper rothianum var. gracilescens Domin; Piper rubrum Reinw. ex Miq.; Piper subvirosum C.DC.; Piper trichophlebium Quisumb.; Piper tutuilae C.DC.; Piper vaupelii Lauterb.; Piperi lonchitum St.-Lag.

= Piper macropiper =

Species of flowering plant

Piper macropiper is a species of plant in the pepper family Piperaceae, native to southeast Asia, Australia and the western Pacific. It was first described in 1800.

== Description ==
Piper macropiper is a creeper or root climber with a stem diameter up to 8 cm (3 in). Leaves are glossy green above and glaucous underneath, and have entire margins. They are ovate in shape, that is, they are broad at the base and narrow to a point at the apex. They measure up to 16 cm (6 in) long and 10 cm (4 in) wide, with two or three pairs of secondary veins radiating from the midrib close to the base and extending to the leaftip.

Inflorescences are spikes up to 13 cm (5 in) long, attached to the stem opposite the leaves by a peduncle about 4 cm (1.6 in) long. This species is dioecious, meaning that pistillate (functionally female) and staminate (functionally male) flowers are borne on separate plants. Flowers are minute, white, and the fruits are also very small, red, and tightly packed together on the spike.

== Distribution and habitat ==
It is native to the following regions:

- Mainland and maritime S.E. Asia: Taiwan, Nicobar Islands, Thailand, Borneo, Jawa, Lesser Sunda Islands, Malaya, Maluku, Philippines, Sulawesi, Sumatera.
- Australasia: New Guinea, Solomon Islands, Northern Territory, Queensland.
- Western Pacific: Caroline Islands, Samoa, Santa Cruz Islands, Tonga, Vanuatu, Wallis-Futuna Islands.

In Australia, P. macropiper grows in rainforest at altitudes from sea level to 800 m (2,600 ft).

== Taxonomy ==
The species was first described by Welsh naturalist, traveller and writer Thomas Pennant in the fourth volume of his work Outlines of the Globe, titled The view of the Malayan Isles, New Holland, and the Spicy Islands, which was published in 1800.

Two varieties are recognised: P. macropiper var. macrophylla (found in Papua New Guinea), and the autonym P. macropiper var. macropiper. A total of 40 synonyms exist for the original name and the two varietal names (see synonyms list).

=== Etymology ===
The name Piper comes from peperi, a Benghalese word for the genus. The species epithet macropiper is derived from 'macro-' combined with the generic name, in reference to its long fruit.

== Conservation ==
This species is listed as least concern under the Queensland Government's Nature Conservation Act. As of 19 April 2026, it has not been assessed by the International Union for Conservation of Nature (IUCN).

== Gallery ==
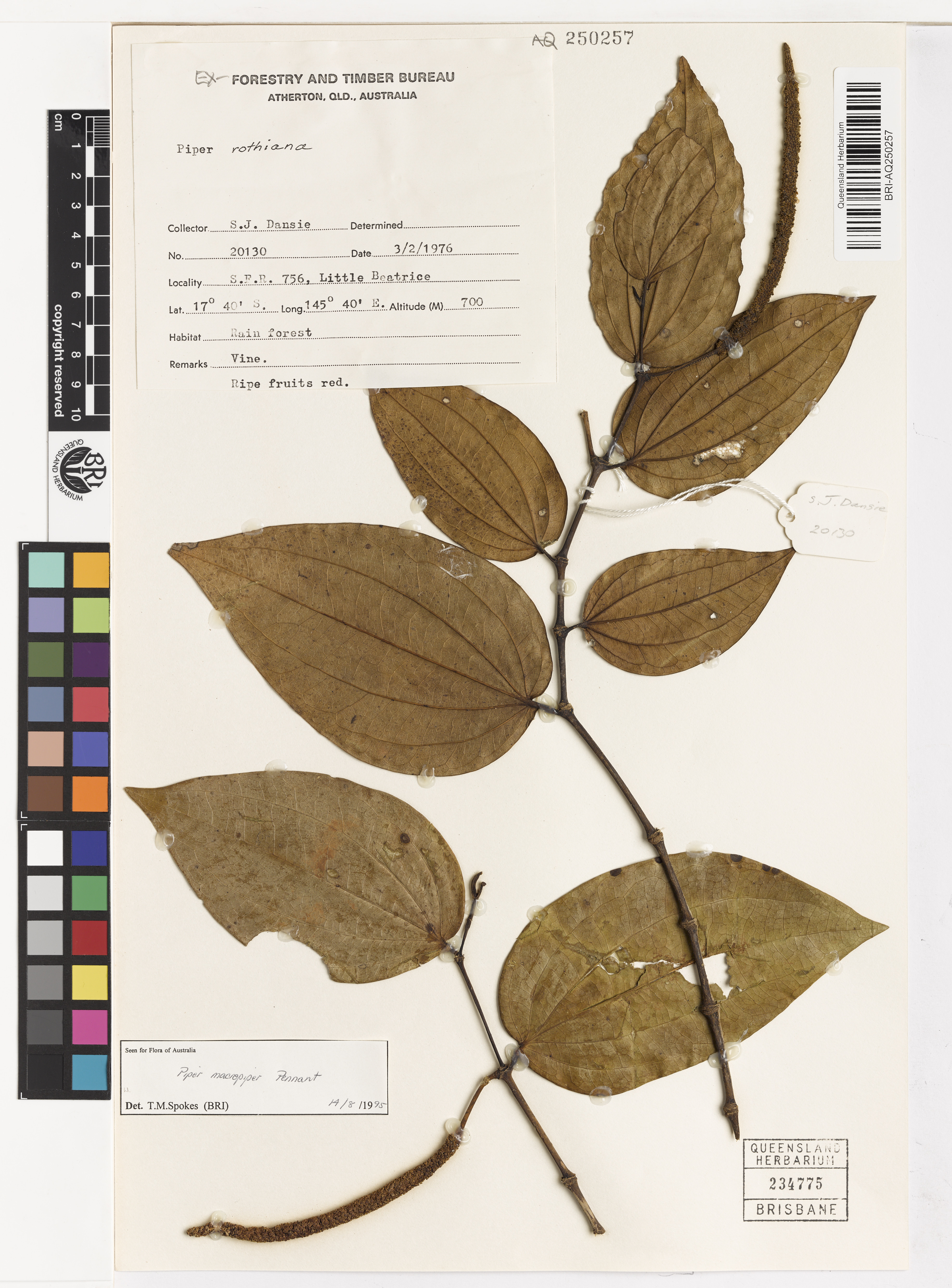
Herbarium specimen

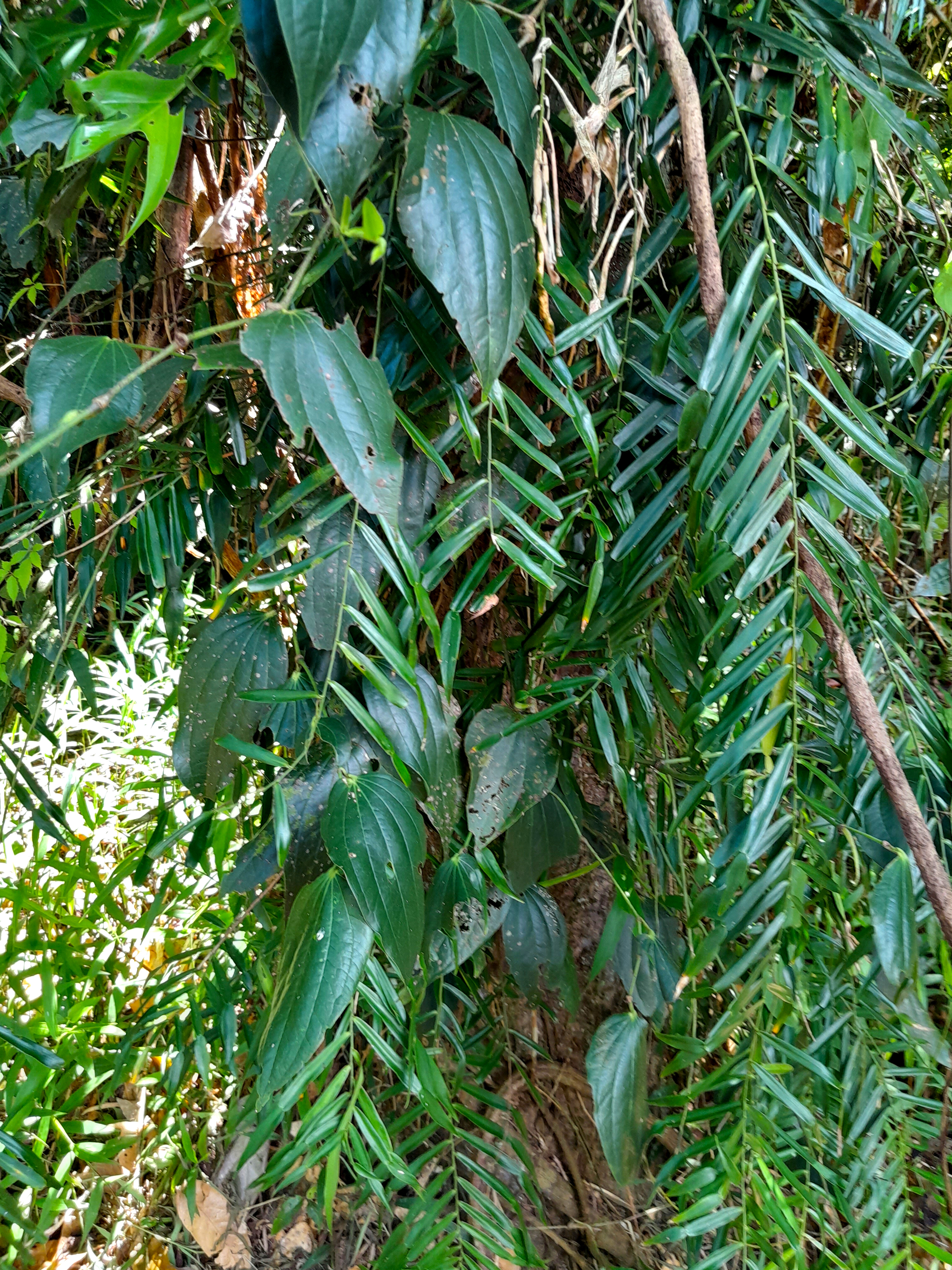
Growing with Pothos longipes

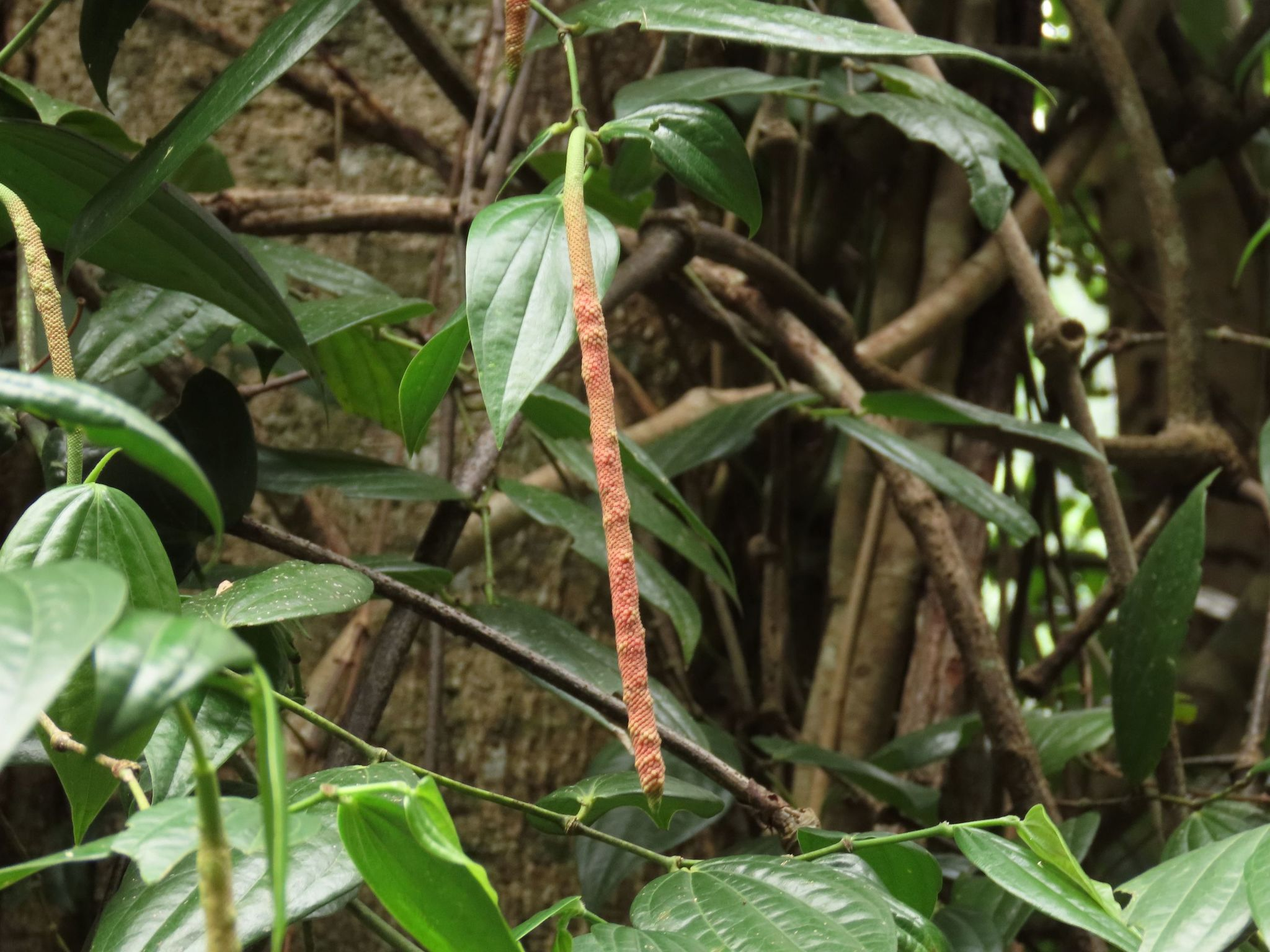
Ripening fruit

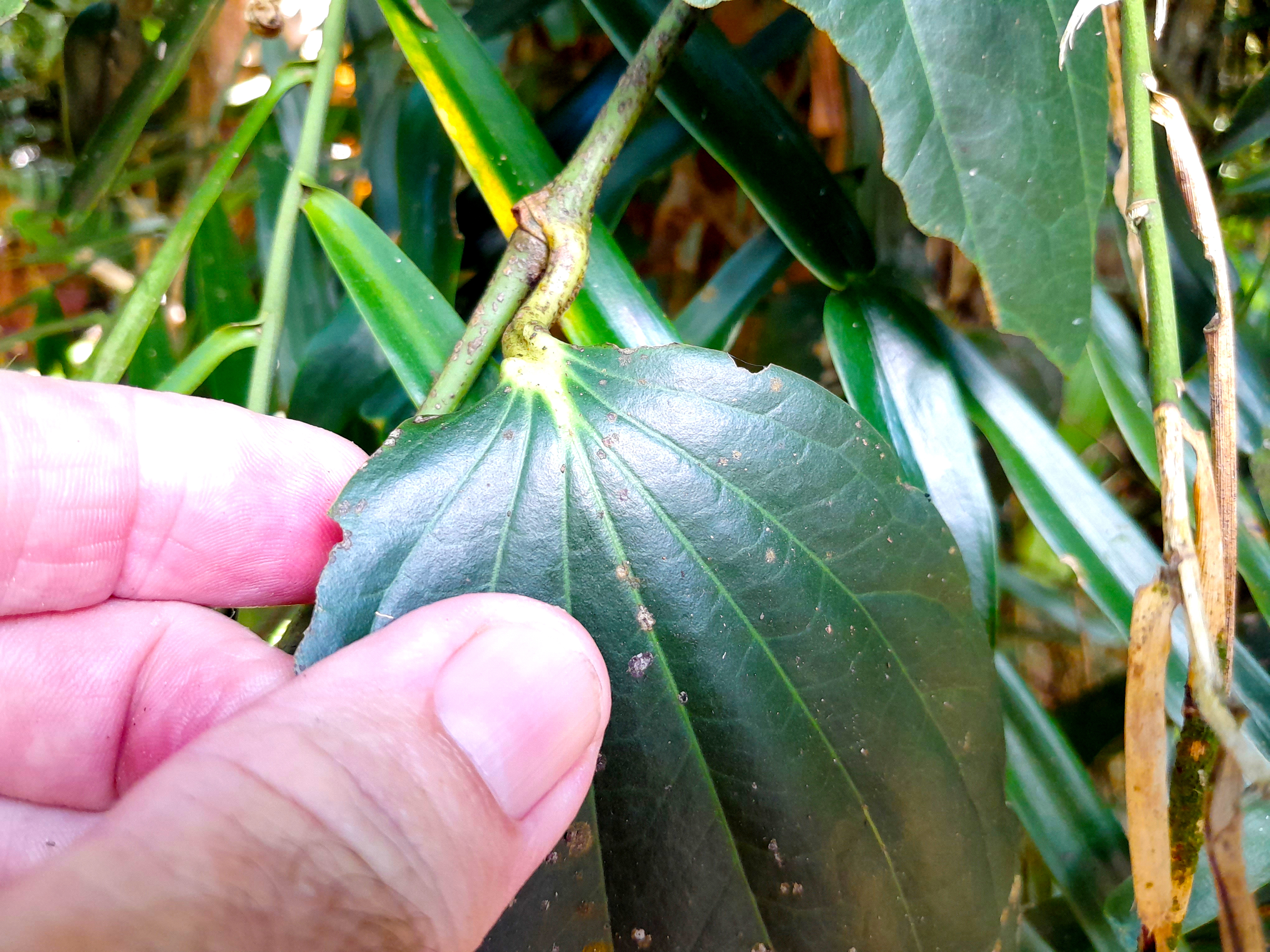
Vine stem, petiole and leaf blade

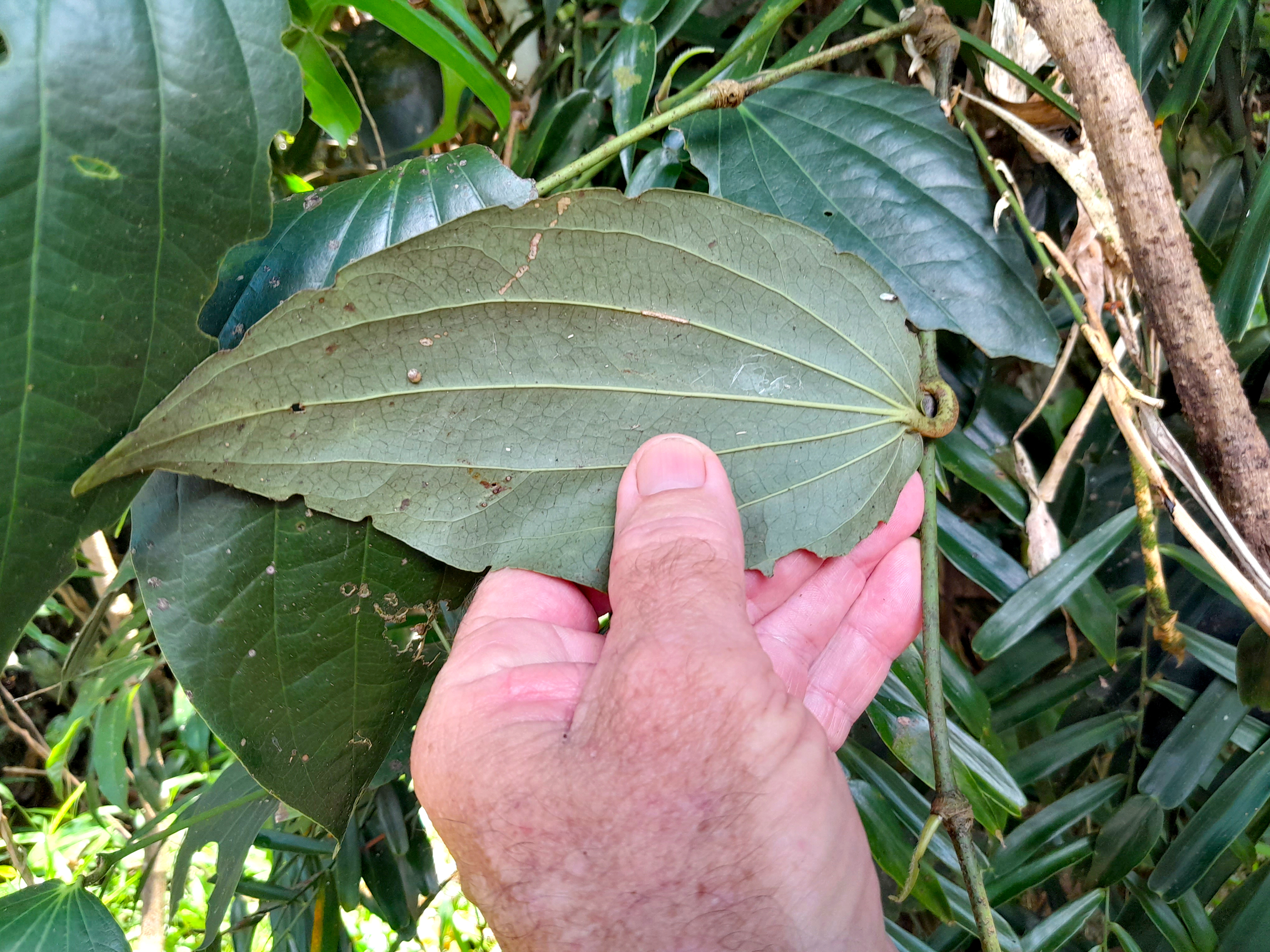
Underside of leaf
