= Black palm =

Black palm is a common name for several species of plants in the family Arecaceae, including:

- Astrocaryum standleyanum, native to Central and South America
- Borassus flabellifer
- Normanbya normanbyi (Queensland black palm)
