= Small-eyed snake =

There are two genera of snake named small-eyed snake:

- Micropechis, a monotypic genus with its sole representative, the New Guinea small-eyed snake, Micropechis ikaheca
- Hydrablabes
