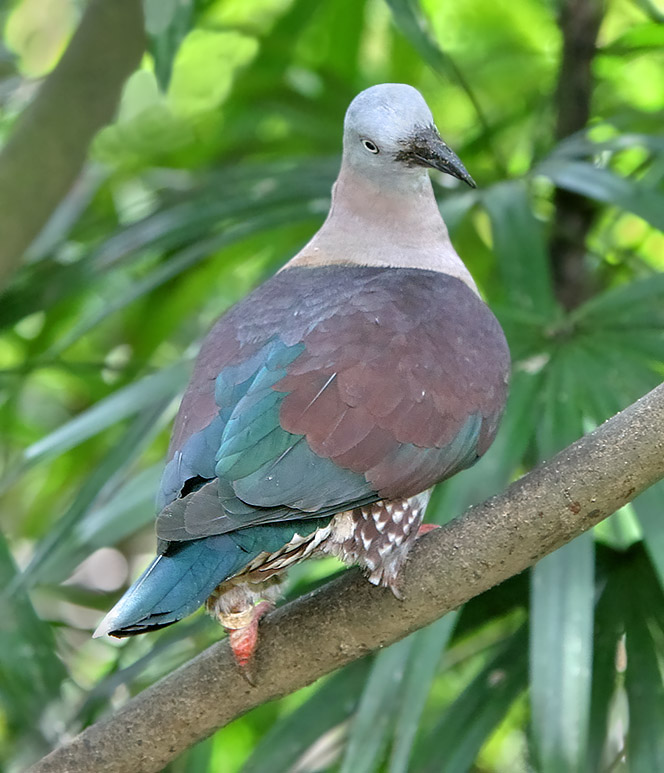
- Ducula zoeae

Conservation status
- Least Concern (IUCN 3.1)

Scientific classification
- Kingdom: Animalia
- Phylum: Chordata
- Class: Aves
- Order: Columbiformes
- Family: Columbidae
- Genus: Ducula
- Species: D. zoeae

Binomial name
- Ducula zoeae (Desmarest, 1826)

= Zoe's imperial pigeon =

Species of bird

Zoe's imperial pigeon or Zoe imperial pigeon (Ducula zoeae), also known as the banded imperial pigeon, is a species of bird in the family Columbidae. It is found in New Guinea. Its natural habitats are subtropical or tropical moist lowland forest, subtropical or tropical mangrove forest, and subtropical or tropical moist montane forest.

It is named after Zoë Lesson (fl. 1810), the wife of French ornithologist René-Primevère Lesson, who described it.
