= Cophixalus riparius =

Conservation status
- Least Concern (IUCN 3.1)

Scientific classification
- Kingdom: Animalia
- Phylum: Chordata
- Class: Amphibia
- Order: Anura
- Family: Microhylidae
- Genus: Cophixalus
- Species: C. riparius

Binomial name
- Cophixalus riparius Zweifel, 1962

Species of frog

Cophixalus riparius is a species of frog in the family Microhylidae. It is endemic to Papua New Guinea and occurs in the New Guinea Highlands in Madang, Southern Highlands, and Western Highlands provinces southeastward to the Morobe Province. The specific name riparius refers to the creek-side habitat from which many specimens in the type series were collected. Common name Wilhelm rainforest frog has been coined for this species.

== Names ==
It is known as gwnm in the Kalam language of Papua New Guinea, a name that is also applied to Xenorhina rostrata.

== Description ==
Adult males grow to at least 45 mm (1.8 in) and adult females to 49 mm (1.9 in) in snout–vent length; males appear to reach maturity by they are 41 mm (1.6 in). The snout is short and bluntly rounded. The tympanum is only barely visible at its lower edge. The supratympanic fold is weak. The fingers and toes bear well-developed discs. Preserved specimens are dorsally purplish brown, with an irregular pattern of dark markings. These markings may sometimes form rugged dorsolateral lines or join to form a network, but only rarely reducing the lighter background to isolated spots.

== Habitat and conservation ==
Cophixalus riparius is found in montane rainforests among boulders and grass near streams at elevations of 1,900–2,800 m (6,200–9,200 ft) above sea level. Development is direct (i.e., there is no free-living larval stage).

This species is common and adaptable, probably able to withstand a degree of habitat degradation. It is not facing significant threats. It might be present in the Mount Kaindi Wildlife Management Area.
