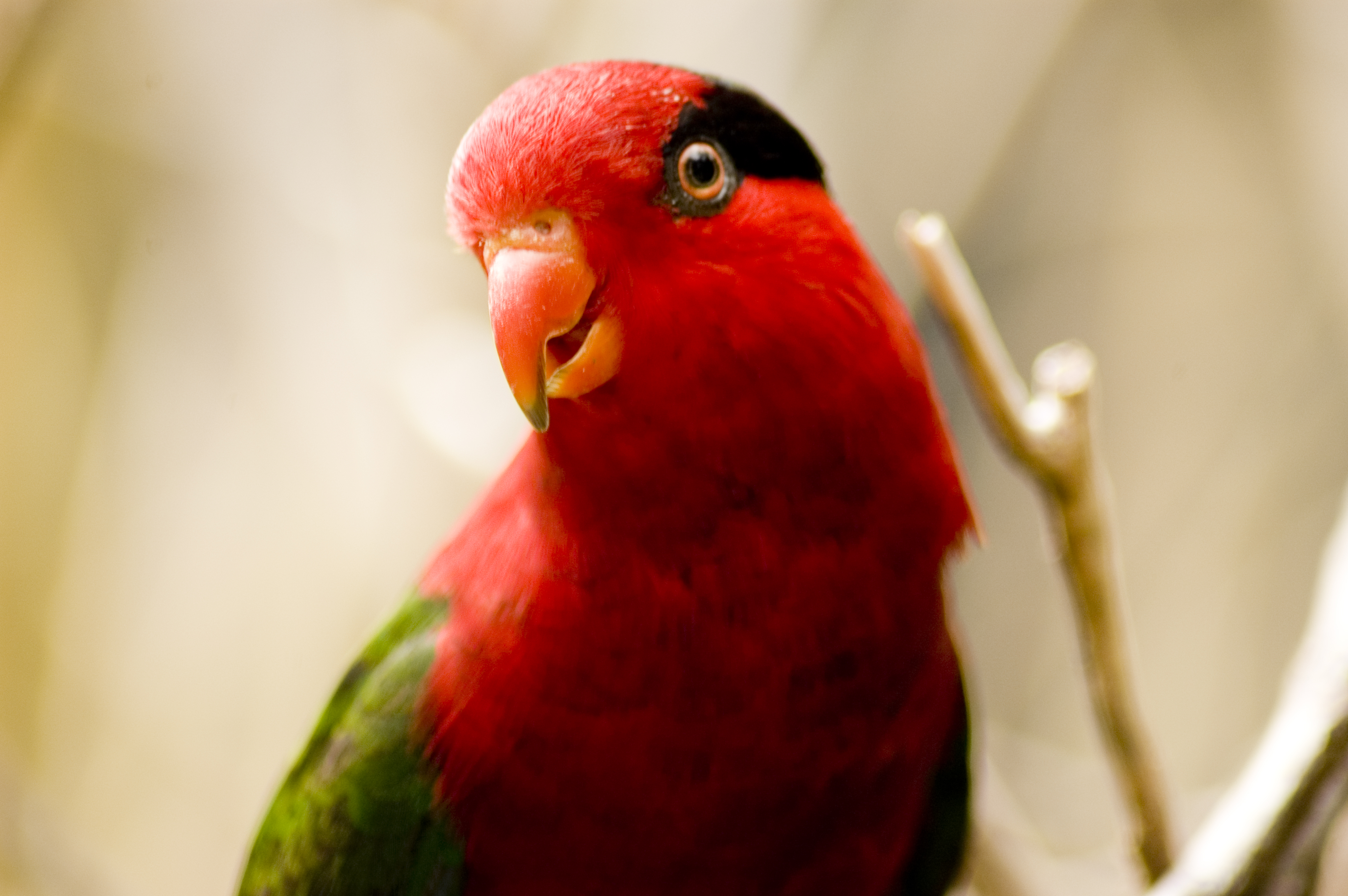
- At Fort Worth Zoo

Conservation status
- Least Concern (IUCN 3.1)

Scientific classification
- Kingdom: Animalia
- Phylum: Chordata
- Class: Aves
- Order: Psittaciformes
- Family: Psittaculidae
- Genus: Charmosyna
- Species: C. papou

Binomial name
- Charmosyna papou (Scopoli, 1786)

= West Papuan lorikeet =

Species of bird

The West Papuan lorikeet (Charmosyna papou) is a species of parrot in the family Psittaculidae. It is found in New Guinea. Its natural habitat is subtropical or tropical moist montane forests.

== Taxonomy and systematics ==
The generic name Charmosyna is from the Greek kharmosunos, meaning joyful. The specific epithet papou refers to New Guinea.

The species is monotypic. The former subspecies C. p. stellae, C. p. wahnesi, and C. p. goliathina are now treated as a separate species, Stella's lorikeet (Charmosyna stellae).
