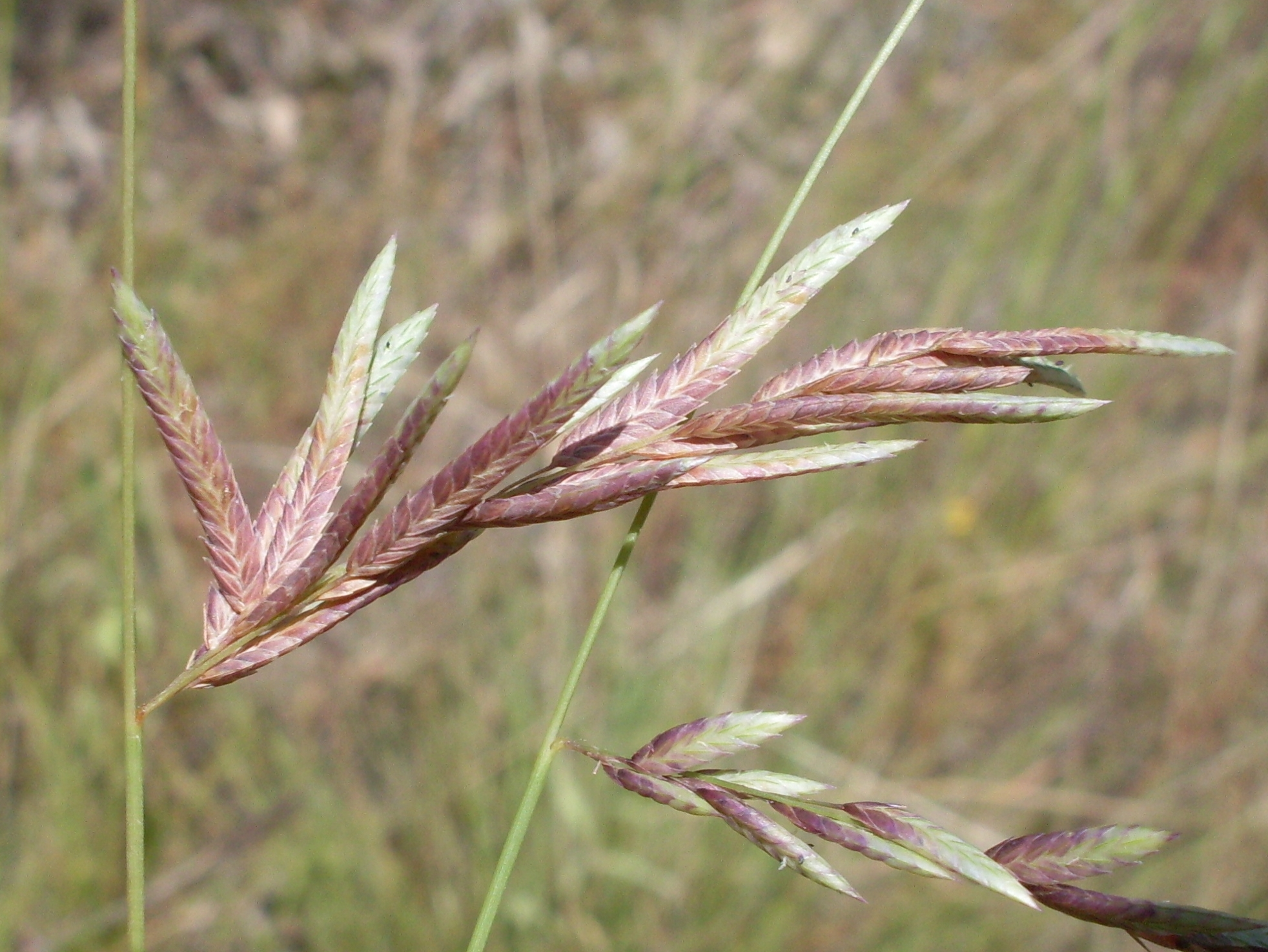

Scientific classification
- Kingdom: Plantae
- Clade: Tracheophytes
- Clade: Angiosperms
- Clade: Monocots
- Clade: Commelinids
- Order: Poales
- Family: Poaceae
- Subfamily: Chloridoideae
- Genus: Eragrostis
- Species: E. brownii

Binomial name
- Eragrostis brownii (Kunth) Nees

= Eragrostis brownii =

Brown's lovegrass

Species of grass

Eragrostis brownii is a widespread species of grass known as Browns lovegrass. Found in Australia and New Zealand, it may be seen growing in woodland or pasture. The grass may grow up to 60 cm (24 in) tall. The specific epithet brownii is named in honour of the Scottish botanist Robert Brown.
