= Dacrydium novoguineense =

Conservation status
- Least Concern (IUCN 3.1)

Scientific classification
- Kingdom: Plantae
- Clade: Tracheophytes
- Clade: Gymnospermae
- Division: Pinophyta
- Class: Pinopsida
- Order: Araucariales
- Family: Podocarpaceae
- Genus: Dacrydium
- Species: D. novoguineense

Binomial name
- Dacrydium novoguineense Gibbs

Species of conifer

Dacrydium novoguineense is a species of conifer in the family Podocarpaceae. It is a tree endemic to New Guinea. It is a widespread and common tree in montane rain forests, extending from the Vogelkop Peninsula to the eastern Highlands. It ranges from 1,300 to 2,800 metres elevation. At elevations below 2,200 metres it is an emergent tree growing above the forest canopy. At higher elevations it is a small tree growing among other low trees, shrubs, and tree ferns in low forest or scrub. It grows in diverse soil types including clay, sand, peat, and quartzite and other rocky soils. It regenerates abundantly after fires and can become temporarily dominant.

The species was first described by Lilian Suzette Gibbs in 1917.
