= Xenorhina rostrata =

Conservation status
- Least Concern (IUCN 3.1)

Scientific classification
- Kingdom: Animalia
- Phylum: Chordata
- Class: Amphibia
- Order: Anura
- Family: Microhylidae
- Genus: Xenorhina
- Species: X. rostrata

Binomial name
- Xenorhina rostrata (Méhely, 1898)

Synonyms
- Choanacantha rostrata Méhely, 1898; Xenobatrachus rostratus — van Kampen, 1919

Species of frog

Xenorhina rostrata is a species of frog in the family Microhylidae. It is found in West Papua in Indonesia and Papua New Guinea. Its natural habitats are subtropical or tropical moist lowland forests, subtropical or tropical moist montane forests, rural gardens, and heavily degraded former forest.

== Names ==
It is known as gwnm in the Kalam language of Papua New Guinea, a name that is also applied to Cophixalus riparius.
