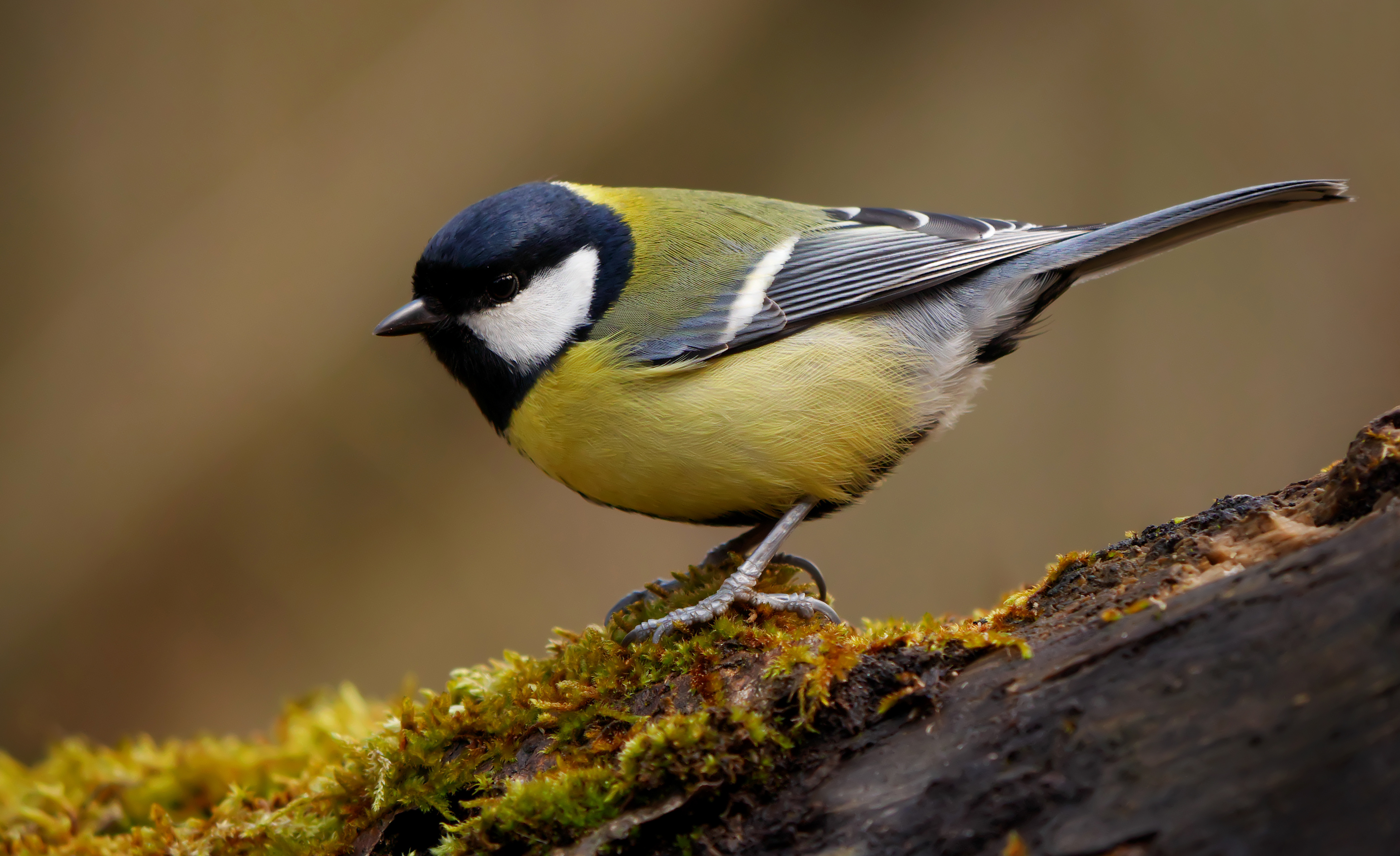
- In Brussels, Belgium

Conservation status
- Least Concern (IUCN 3.1)

Scientific classification
- Kingdom: Animalia
- Phylum: Chordata
- Class: Aves
- Order: Passeriformes
- Family: Paridae
- Genus: Parus
- Species: P. major

Binomial name
- Parus major Linnaeus, 1758
- Range of current and former subspecies groups

= Great tit =

Great tit Temporal range: Gelasian–Present (Note: Fossil remains are known from between 1.81 and 0.78 million years ago.)

Passerine bird in the tit family Paridae

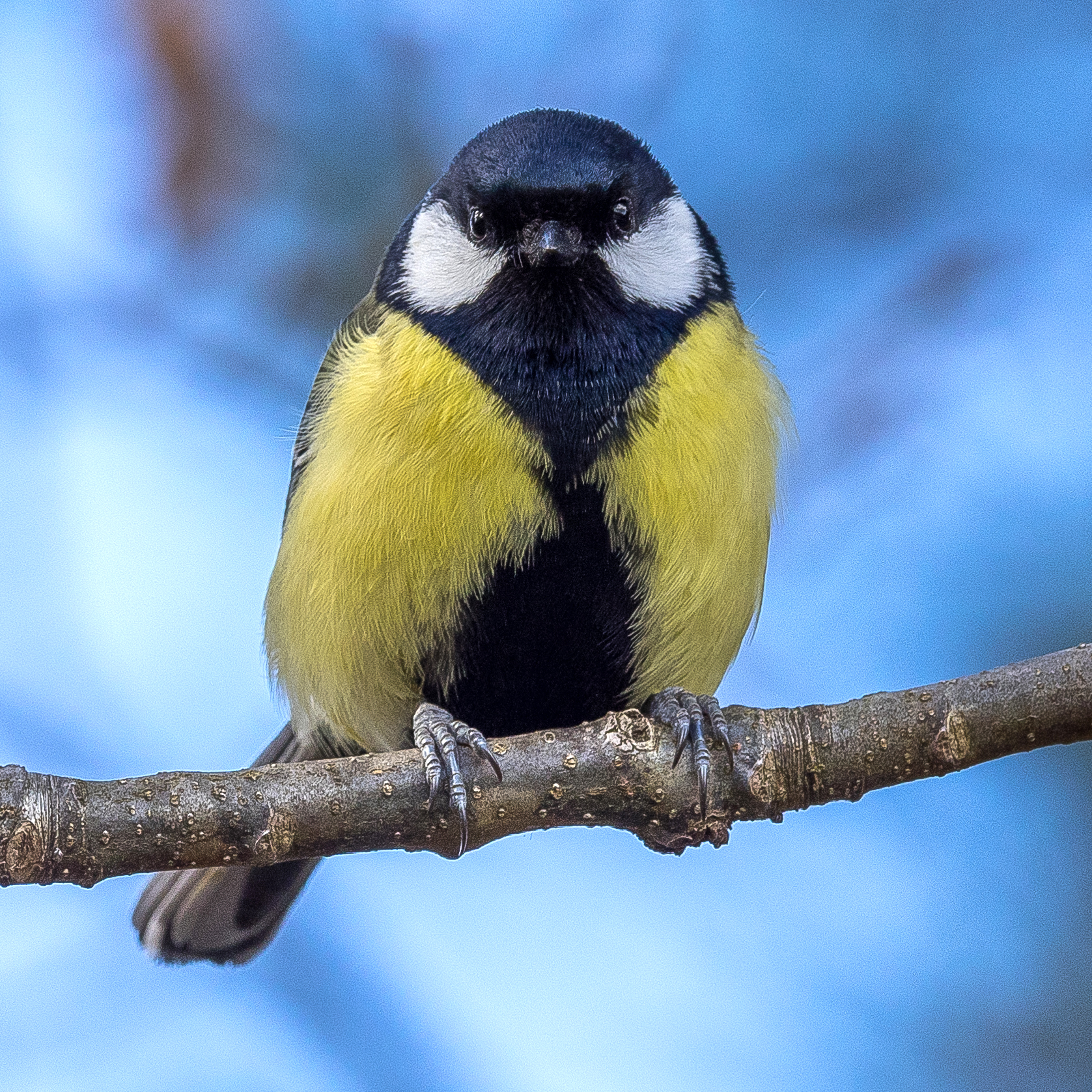
Great tit in Sweden, winter 2016

The great tit (Parus major) is a small passerine bird in the tit family Paridae. It is widespread and common throughout Europe, the Middle East, Central Asia and as far east as the Amur River. It also occurs in parts of North Africa where it is generally resident in any sort of woodland. Most great tits do not migrate, except in extremely harsh winters. Until 2005 this species was lumped with numerous other subspecies. However, DNA studies have revealed that these subspecies are distinct from the great tit, and they have now been classified as two distinct species, the cinereous tit (Parus cinereus) of southern Asia, and the Japanese tit (Parus minor) of East Asia. The great tit remains the most widespread species in the genus Parus.

The great tit is a distinctive bird with a black head and neck, prominent white cheeks, olive-coloured upperparts and yellow underparts. There is some variation amongst the numerous subspecies. Predominantly insectivorous in the summer, the species consumes a wider range of food items in the winter months, including small hibernating bats. Like all tits, it is a cavity nester, usually nesting in a tree hole. The female lays around 12 eggs and incubates them alone, although both parents raise the chicks. In most years, the pair will raise two broods. However, the nests may be raided by woodpeckers, squirrels and weasels and may become infested with fleas, and adults may be hunted by sparrowhawks. The great tit has adapted well to human-induced environmental changes and is a common and familiar bird in urban parks and gardens. The great tit is also an important study species in ornithology.

== Taxonomy ==
The great tit was first described under its current binomial name by Carl Linnaeus in his 1758 10th edition of Systema Naturae. Its scientific name is derived from the Latin parus "tit" and maior "larger". Francis Willughby had used the name in the 17th century.

The great tit was formerly considered to range from Britain to Japan and south to the islands of Indonesia, with 36 described subspecies ascribed to four main species groups. The major group comprised 13 subspecies across Europe, temperate Asia and north Africa; the minor group's nine subspecies occurred from southeast Russia and Japan into northern southeast Asia and the 11 subspecies in the cinereus group were found from Iran across south Asia to Indonesia. The three bokharensis subspecies were often treated as a separate species, Parus bokharensis, the Turkestan tit. This form was once thought to form a ring species around the Tibetan Plateau, with gene flow throughout the subspecies, but this theory was abandoned when sequences of mitochondrial DNA were examined, finding that the four groups were distinct (monophyletic) and that the hybridisation zones between the groups were the result of secondary contact after a temporary period of isolation.

A study published in 2005 confirmed that the major group was distinct from the cinereus and minor groups and that along with P. m. bokharensis it diverged from these two groups around 1.5 million years ago. The divergence between the bokharensis and major groups was estimated to have been about half a million years ago. The study also examined hybrids between representatives of the major and minor groups in the Amur Valley where the two meet. Hybrids were rare, suggesting that there were some reproductive barriers between the two groups. The study recommended that the two eastern groups be split out as new species, the cinereous tit (Parus cinereus), and the Japanese tit (Parus minor), but that the Turkestan tit be lumped in with the great tit. This taxonomy has been followed by some authorities, for example the IOC World Bird List. The Handbook of the Birds of the World volume treating the Parus species went for the more traditional classification, treating the Turkestan tit as a separate species but retaining the Japanese and cinereous tits with the great tit, a move that has not been without criticism.

The nominate subspecies of the great tit is the most widespread, its range stretching from the Iberian Peninsula to the Amur Valley and from Scandinavia to the Middle East. The other subspecies have much more restricted distributions; four are confined to islands, while the rest of the P. m. major subspecies represent former glacial refuge populations. The dominance of a single, morphologically uniform subspecies over such a large area suggests that the nominate race rapidly recolonised a large area after the last glacial epoch. This hypothesis is supported by genetic studies which suggest a geologically recent genetic bottleneck followed by a rapid population expansion.

The genus Parus once held most of the species of tit in the family Paridae, but morphological and genetic studies led to the splitting of that large genus in 1998. The great tit was retained in Parus, which along with Cyanistes comprises a lineage of tits known as the "non-hoarders", with reference to the hoarding behaviour of members of the other clade. The genus Parus is still the largest in the family, but may be split again. Other than those species formerly considered to be subspecies, the great tit's closest relatives are the white-naped and green-backed tits of southern Asia. Hybrids with tits outside the genus Parus are very rare, but have been recorded with blue tit, coal tit, and probably marsh tit.

=== Subspecies ===
There are currently 15 recognised subspecies of great tit:

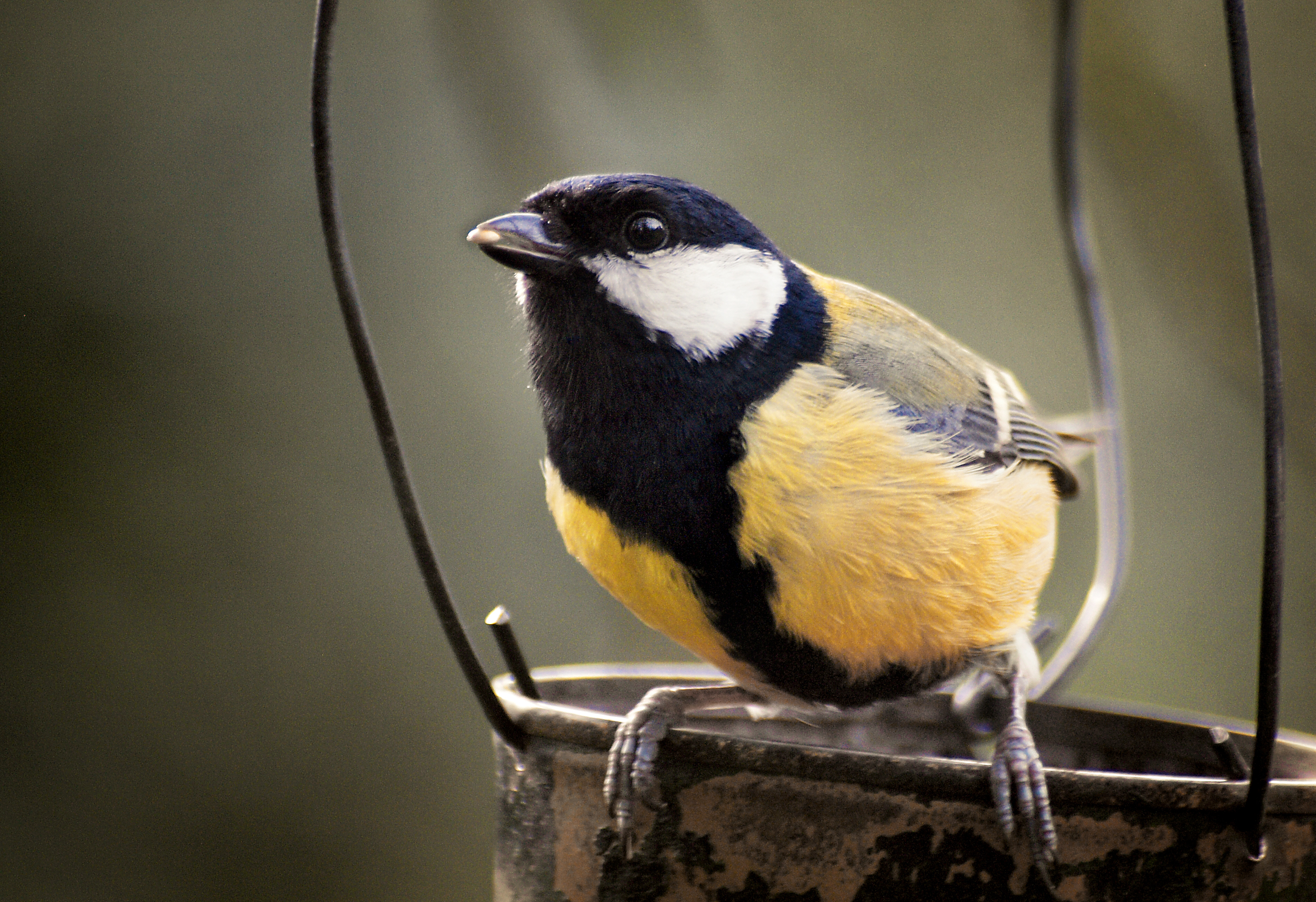
At Kew Gardens, London. The British subspecies P. m. newtoni has a wider mid-line ventral stripe on the lower belly than the nominate race.

- P. m. newtoni, described by Pražák in 1894, is found across the British Isles.
- P. m. major, described by Linnaeus in 1758, is found throughout much of Europe, Asia Minor, northern and eastern Kazakhstan, southern Siberia and northern Mongolia, as far as the mid-Amur Valley.
- P. m. excelsus, described by Buvry in 1857, is found in northwestern Africa.
- P. m. corsus, described by Kleinschmidt in 1903, is found in Portugal, southern Spain, and Corsica.
- P. m. mallorcae, described by von Jordans in 1913, is found in the Balearic Islands.
- P. m. ecki, described by von Jordans in 1970, is found on Sardinia.
- P. m. niethammeri, described by von Jordans in 1970, is found on Crete.
- P. m. aphrodite, described by Madarász in 1901, is found in southern Italy, southern Greece, Cyprus and the Aegean Islands.
- P. m. terrasanctae was described by Hartert in 1910. It is found in Lebanon, Israel, Jordan and Syria.
- P. m. karelini, described by Zarudny in 1910, is found in southeastern Azerbaijan and northwestern Iran.
- P. m. blandfordi was described by Pražák in 1894. It is found in north central and southwestern Iran.
- P. m. bokharensis was described by Lichtenstein in 1823. It is found in southern Kazakhstan, Uzbekistan, Turkmenistan and far north of Iran and Afghanistan. It was, along with following two subspecies, once treated as separate species.
- P. m. turkestanicus, was described by Zarudny & Loudon in 1905, and ranges from east Kazakhstan to extreme north west China and west Mongolia.
- P. m. ferghanensis, was described by Buturlin in 1912, and is found in Tajikistan and Kyrgyzstan.
- P. m. kapustini, was described by Portenko in 1954, and is found in north west China (north west Xinjiang) to Mongolia and Siberia.

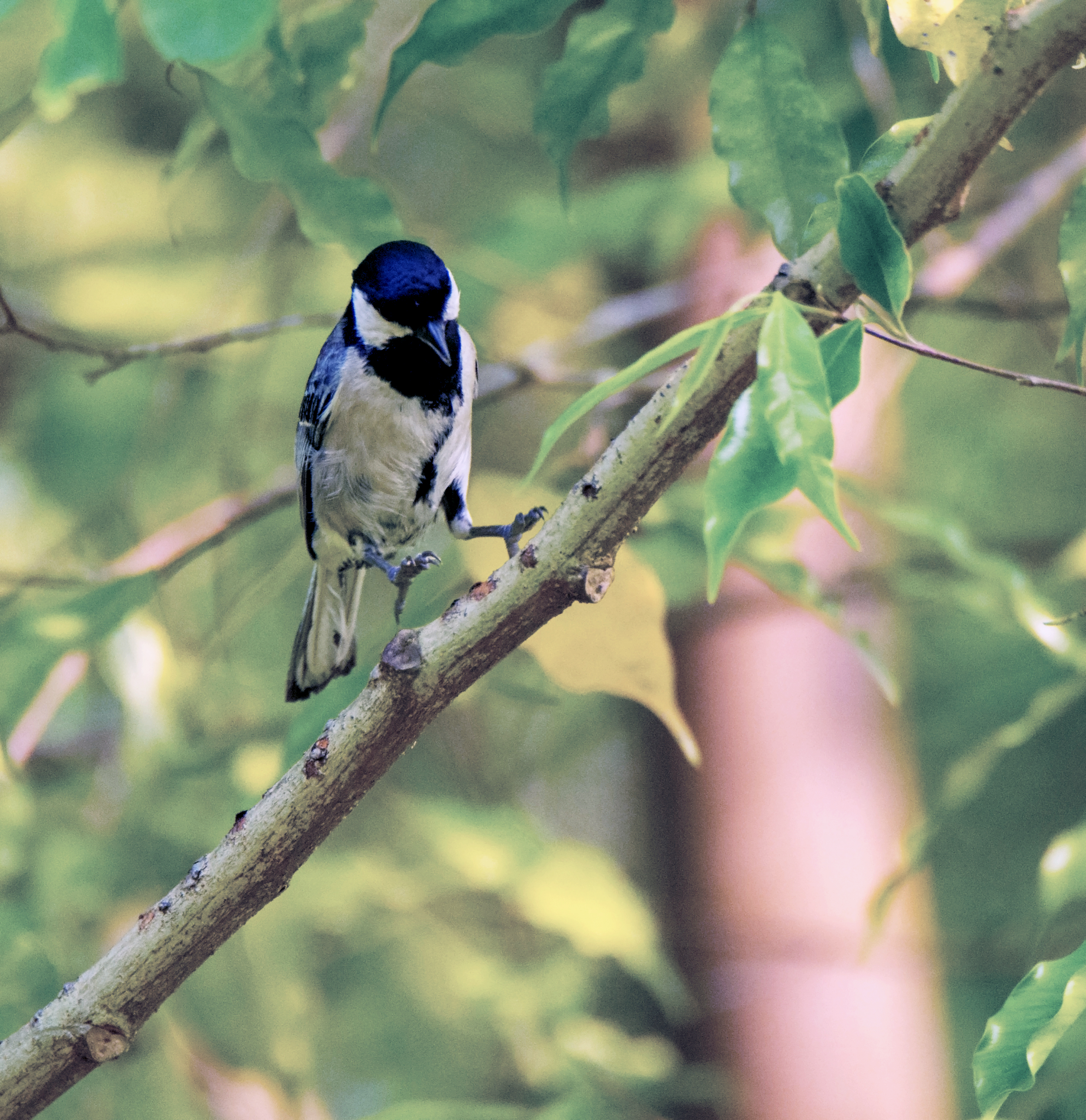
Great tit on a branch

== Description ==
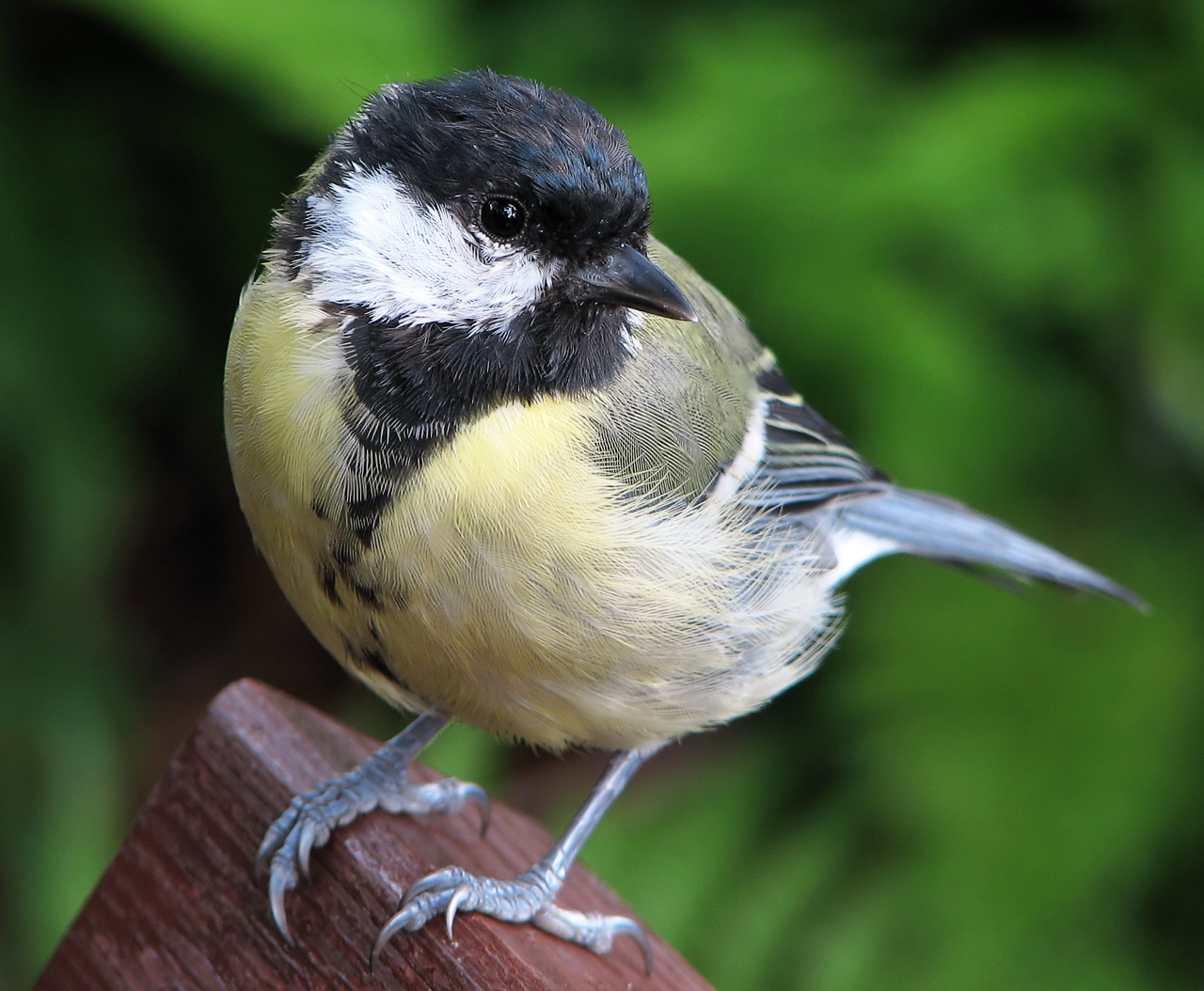
In females and juveniles the mid-line stripe is narrower and sometimes discontinuous.

The great tit is large for a tit at 12.5 to 14 cm (4 7/8–5 1/2 in) in length, and has a distinctive appearance that makes it easy to recognise. The nominate race P. major major has a bluish-black crown, black neck, throat, bib and head, and white cheeks and ear coverts. The breast is bright lemon-yellow and there is a broad black mid-line stripe running from the bib to vent. There is a dull white spot on the neck turning to greenish yellow on the upper nape. The rest of the nape and back are green tinged with olive. The wing-coverts are green, the rest of the wing is bluish-grey with a white wing-bar. The tail is bluish grey with white outer tips. The plumage of the female is similar to that of the male except that the colours are overall duller; the bib is less intensely black, as is the line running down the belly, which is also narrower and sometimes broken. Young birds are like the female, except that they have dull olive-brown napes and necks, greyish rumps, and greyer tails, with less defined white tips.

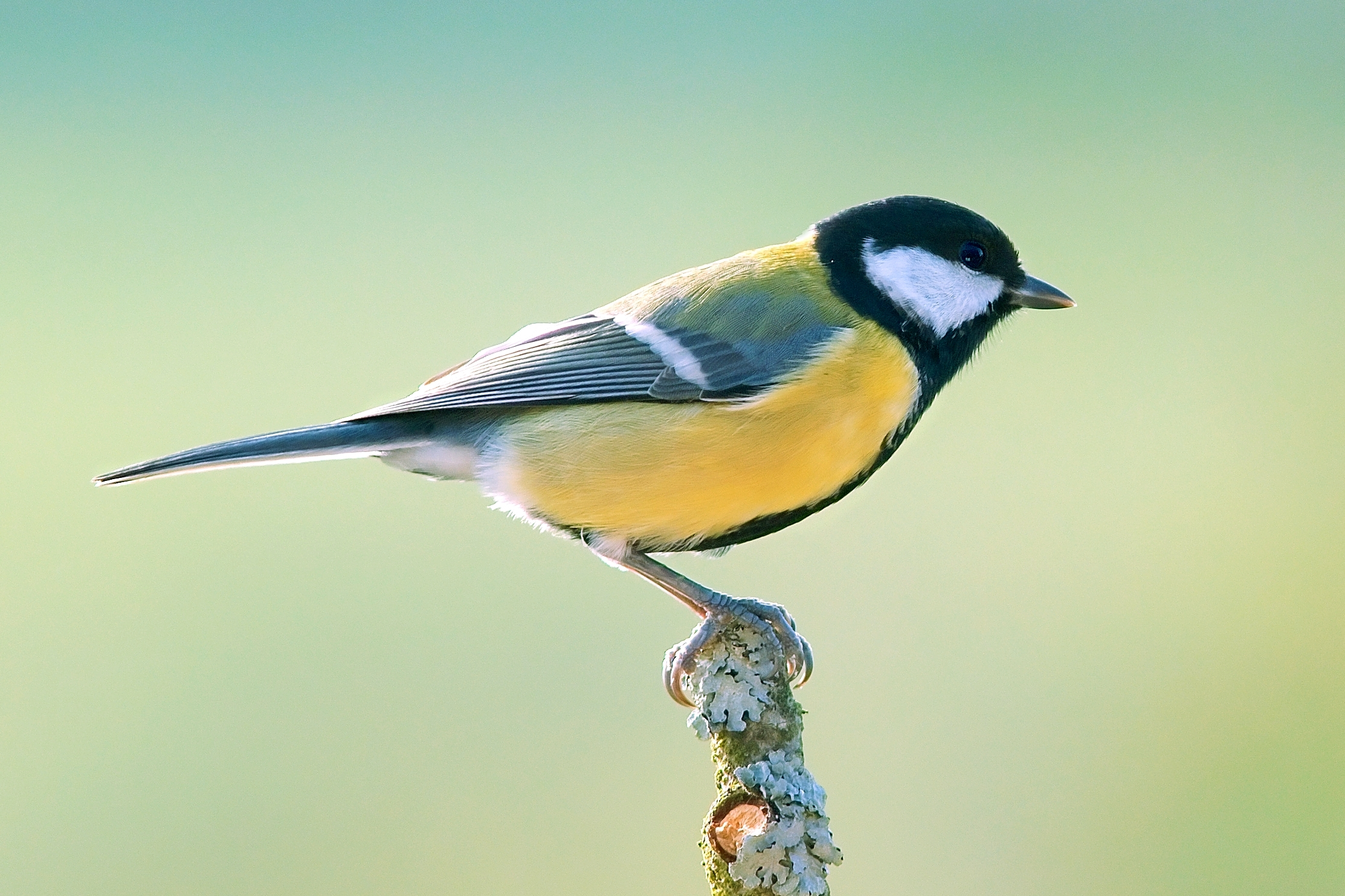
The plumage of the male is typically bright, although this varies by subspecies

There is some variation in the subspecies. P. m. newtoni is like the nominate race but has a slightly longer bill, the mantle is slightly deeper green, there is less white on the tail tips, and the ventral mid-line stripe is broader on the belly. P. m. corsus also resembles the nominate form but has duller upperparts, less white in the tail and less yellow in the nape. P. m. mallorcae is like the nominate subspecies, but has a larger bill, greyer-blue upperparts and slightly paler underparts. P. m. ecki is like P. m. mallorcae except with bluer upperparts and paler underparts. P. m. excelsus is similar to the nominate race but has much brighter green upperparts, bright yellow underparts and no (or very little) white on the tail. P. m. aphrodite has darker, more olive-grey upperparts, and the underparts are more yellow to pale cream. P. m. niethammeri is similar to P. m. aphrodite but the upperparts are duller and less green, and the underparts are pale yellow. P. m. terrasanctae resembles the previous two subspecies but has slightly paler upperparts. P. m. blandfordi is like the nominate but with a greyer mantle and scapulars and pale yellow underparts, and P. m. karelini is intermediate between the nominate and P. m. blandfordi, and lacks white on the tail. The plumage of P. m. bokharensis is much greyer, pale creamy white to washed out grey underparts, a larger white cheep patch, a grey tail, wings, back and nape. It is also slightly smaller, with a smaller bill but longer tail. The situation is similar for the two related subspecies in the Turkestan tit group. P. m. turkestanicus is like P. m. bokharensis but with a larger bill and darker upperparts. P. m. ferghanensis is like P. m. bokharensis but with a smaller bill, darker grey on the flanks and a more yellow wash on the juvenile birds.

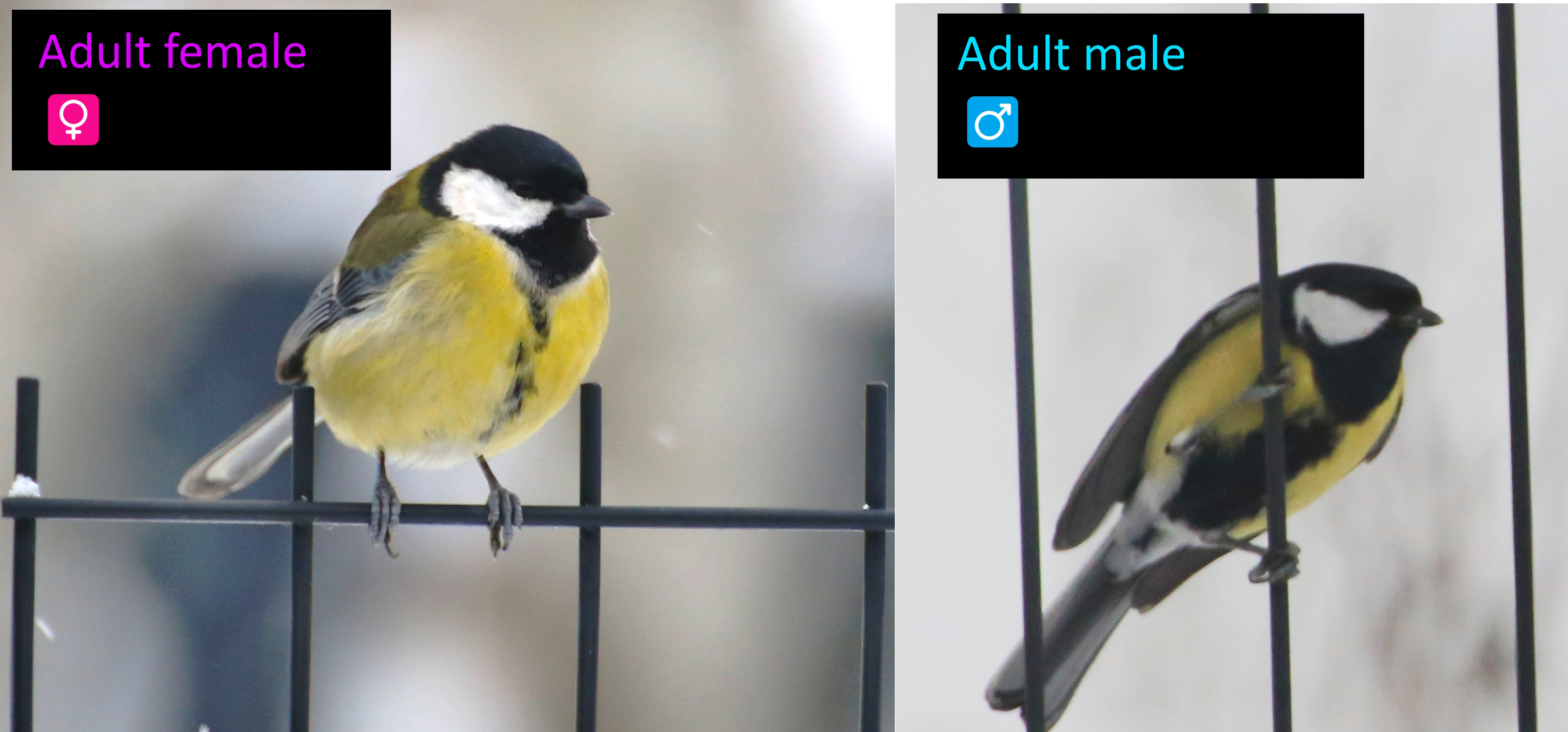
Female and male great tits

The colour of the male bird's breast has been shown to correlate with stronger sperm, and is one way that the male demonstrates his reproductive superiority to females. Higher levels of carotenoid increase the intensity of the yellow of the breast its colour, and also enable the sperm to better withstand the onslaught of free radicals. Carotenoids cannot be synthesized by the bird and have to be obtained from food, so a bright colour in a male demonstrates his ability to obtain good nutrition. However, the saturation of the yellow colour is also influenced by environmental factors, such as weather conditions. The width of the male's ventral stripe, which varies with individual, is selected for by females, with higher quality females apparently selecting males with wider stripes.

=== Voice ===
Song type

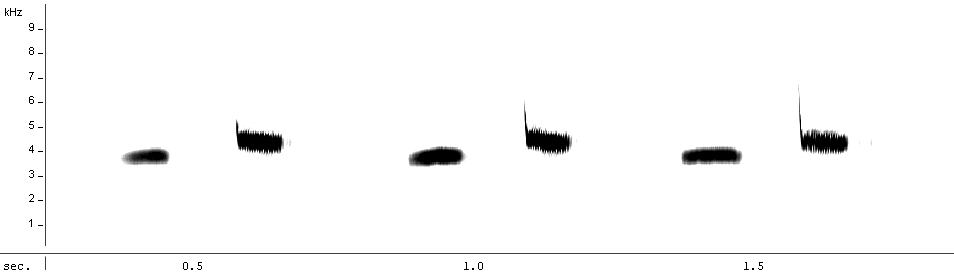
Great tit sonagram

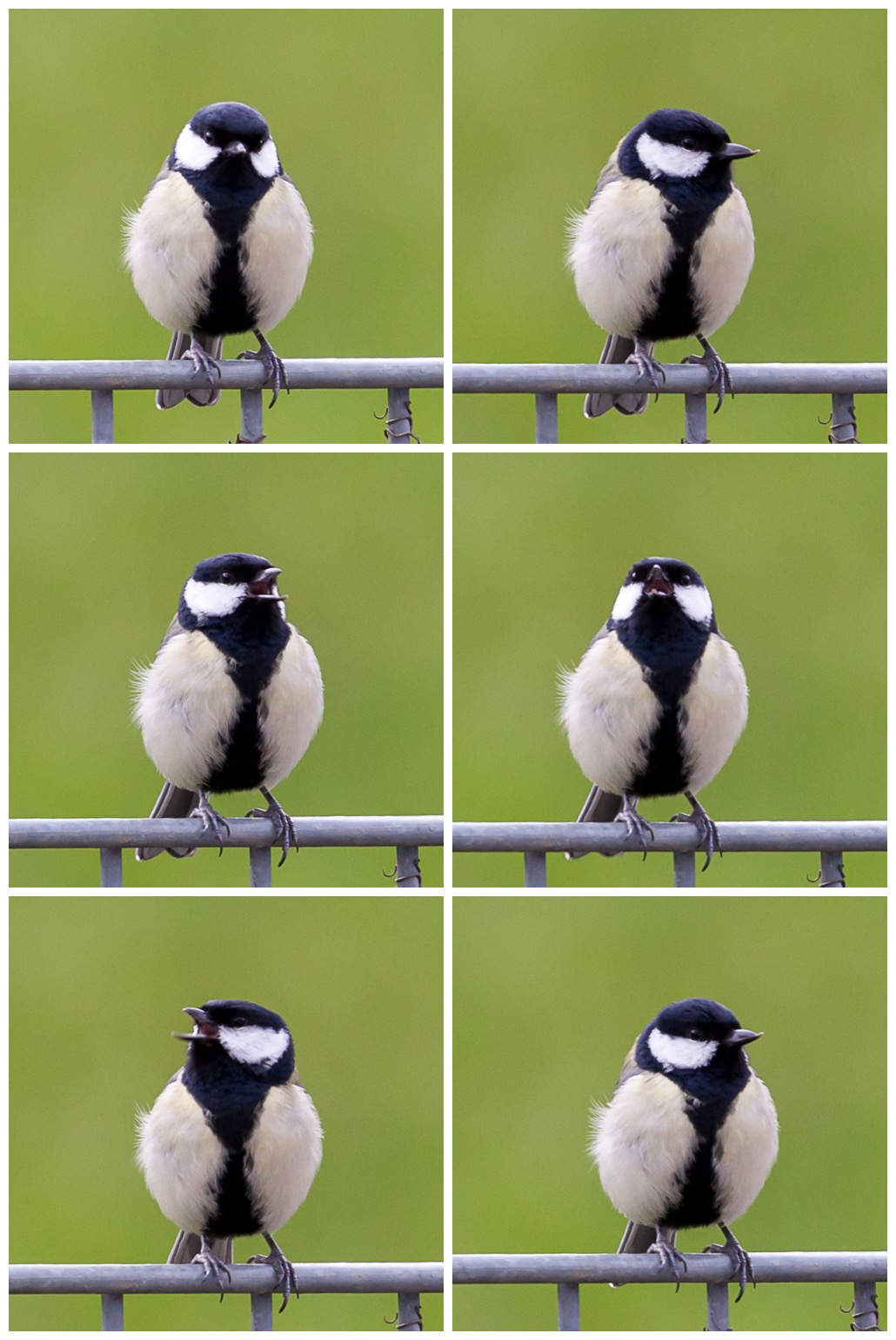
Great tit twittering

The great tit is, like other tits, a vocal bird, and has up to 40 types of calls and songs. The calls are generally the same between the sexes, but the male is much more vocal and the female rarely calls. Soft single notes such as "pit", "spick", or "chit" are used as contact calls. A loud "tink" is used by adult males as an alarm or in territorial disputes. One of the most familiar is a "teacher, teacher", often likened to a squeaky wheelbarrow wheel, which is used in proclaiming ownership of a territory. In former times, English folk considered the "saw-sharpening" call to be a foretelling of rain. Tit calls from different geographic regions show some variation, and tits from the two south Asian groups recently split from the great tit do not recognise or react to the calls of the temperate great tits.

One explanation for the great tit's wide repertoire is the Beau Geste hypothesis. In the novel, the eponymous hero propped up dead soldiers against the battlements to create the illusion that his fort was more strongly defended than it actually was. Similarly, the variety of calls creates the impression that the tit's territory is more densely occupied than it actually is. Regardless of whether the theory is correct, birds with large vocabularies tend to be socially dominant and breed more successfully.

== Distribution, movements and habitat ==
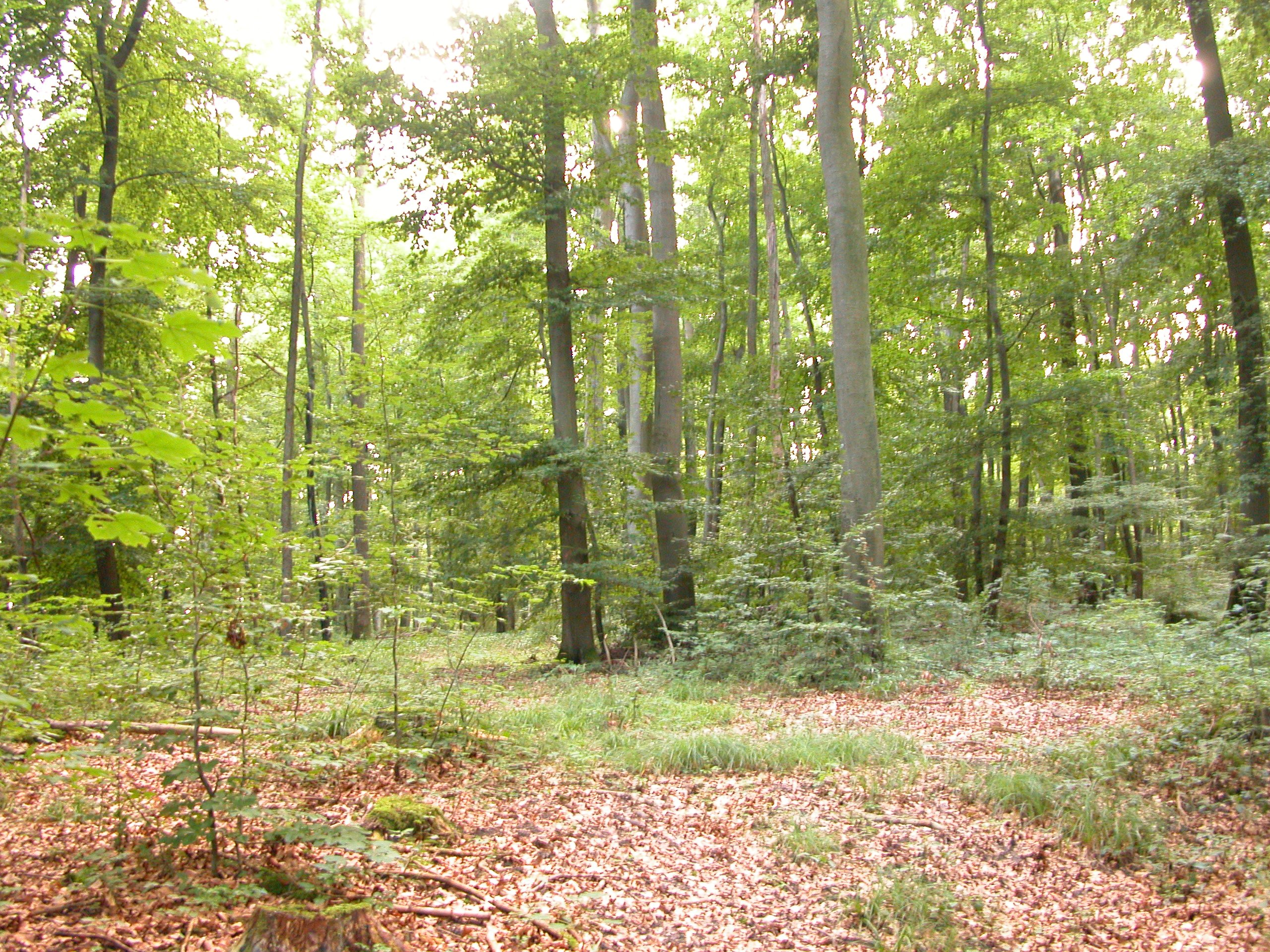
Mixed forests are one of the habitats great tits use in Europe.

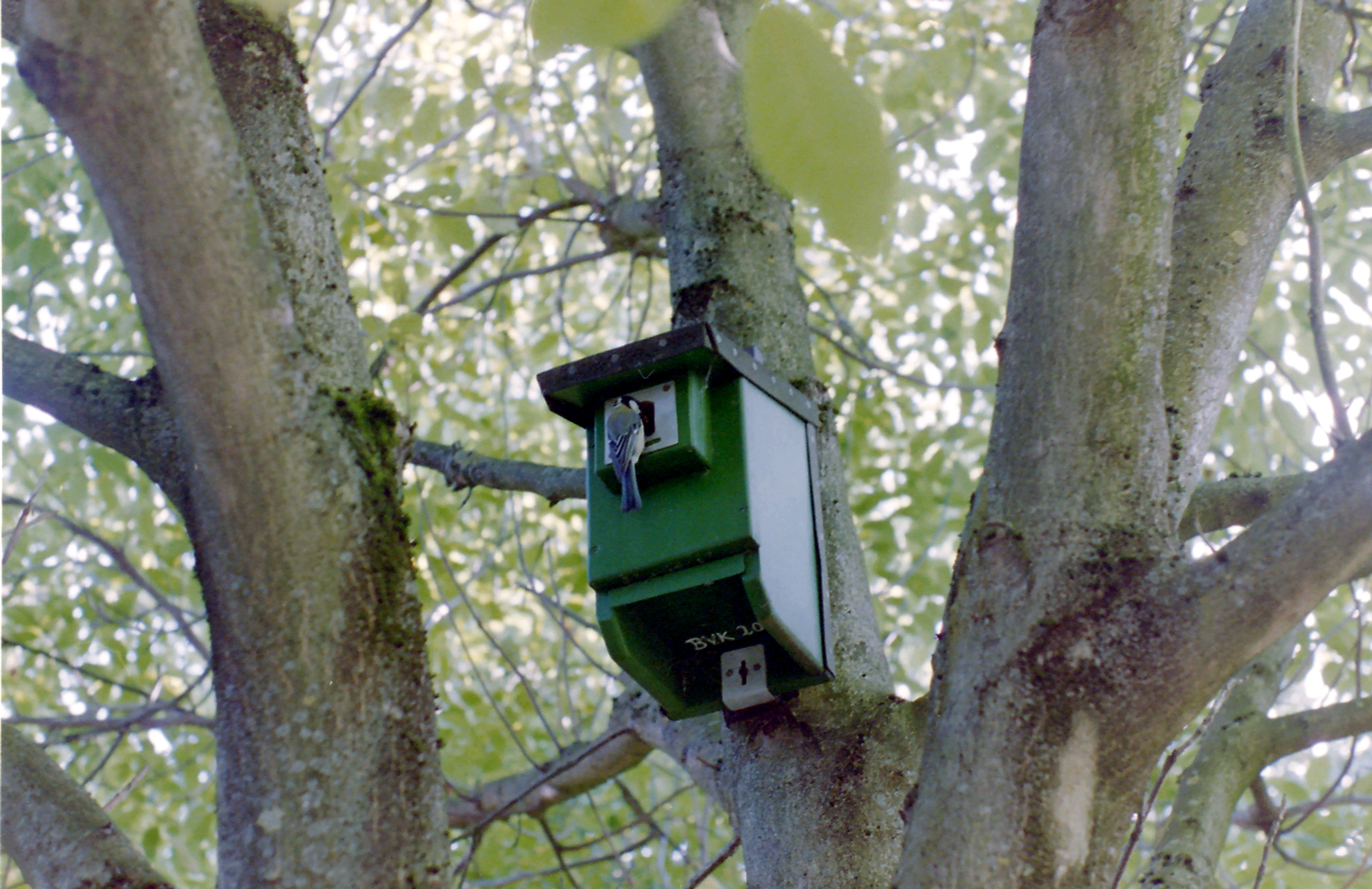
A nest box in Altenbeken, Germany

The great tit has a wide distribution across much of Eurasia. It can be found across all of Europe except for Iceland and northern Scandinavia, including numerous Mediterranean islands. In North Africa it lives in Morocco, Algeria and Tunisia. It also occurs across the Middle East, and parts of Central Asia from northern Iran and Afghanistan to Mongolia, as well as across northern Asia from the Urals as far east as northern China and the Amur Valley.

The great tit occupies a variety of habitats. It is most commonly found in open deciduous woodland, mixed forests, forest edges and gardens. In dense forests, including conifer forests it prefers forest clearings. In northern Siberia it lives in the boreal taiga. In North Africa it resides primarily in oak forests, as well as in stands of Atlas cedar and even palm groves. In the eastern part of its range, in Siberia, Mongolia and China, it favours riverine willow and birch forest. Riverine woodlands of willows, poplars are among the habitats of the Turkestan subspecies, as well as low scrubland, oases; at higher altitudes it occupies habitats ranging from dense deciduous and coniferous forests to open areas with scattered trees.

The great tit is generally not migratory. Pairs will usually remain near or in their territory year round, even in the northern parts of their range. Young birds will disperse from their parents' territory, but usually not far. Populations may become irruptive in poor or harsh winters, meaning that groups of up to a thousand birds may unpredictably move from northern Europe to the Baltic and also to Netherlands, Britain, even as far as the southern Balkans.

The great tit was introduced to the United States, but failed to become established after birds were released near Cincinnati, Ohio, between 1872 and 1874. Suggestions that they would be an effective way of controlling codling moths nearly led to their introduction to some new areas, particularly in the United States, but this plan was not implemented. A small population is present in the upper Midwest, believed to be the descendants of birds liberated in Chicago in 2002 along with European goldfinches, Eurasian jays, common chaffinches, European greenfinches, saffron finches, blue tits and Eurasian linnets, although sightings of some of these species pre-date the supposed introduction date. Birds were introduced to the Almaty Province in what is now Kazakhstan in 1960–61 and became established, although their present status is unclear.

== Behaviour ==
=== Diet and feeding ===
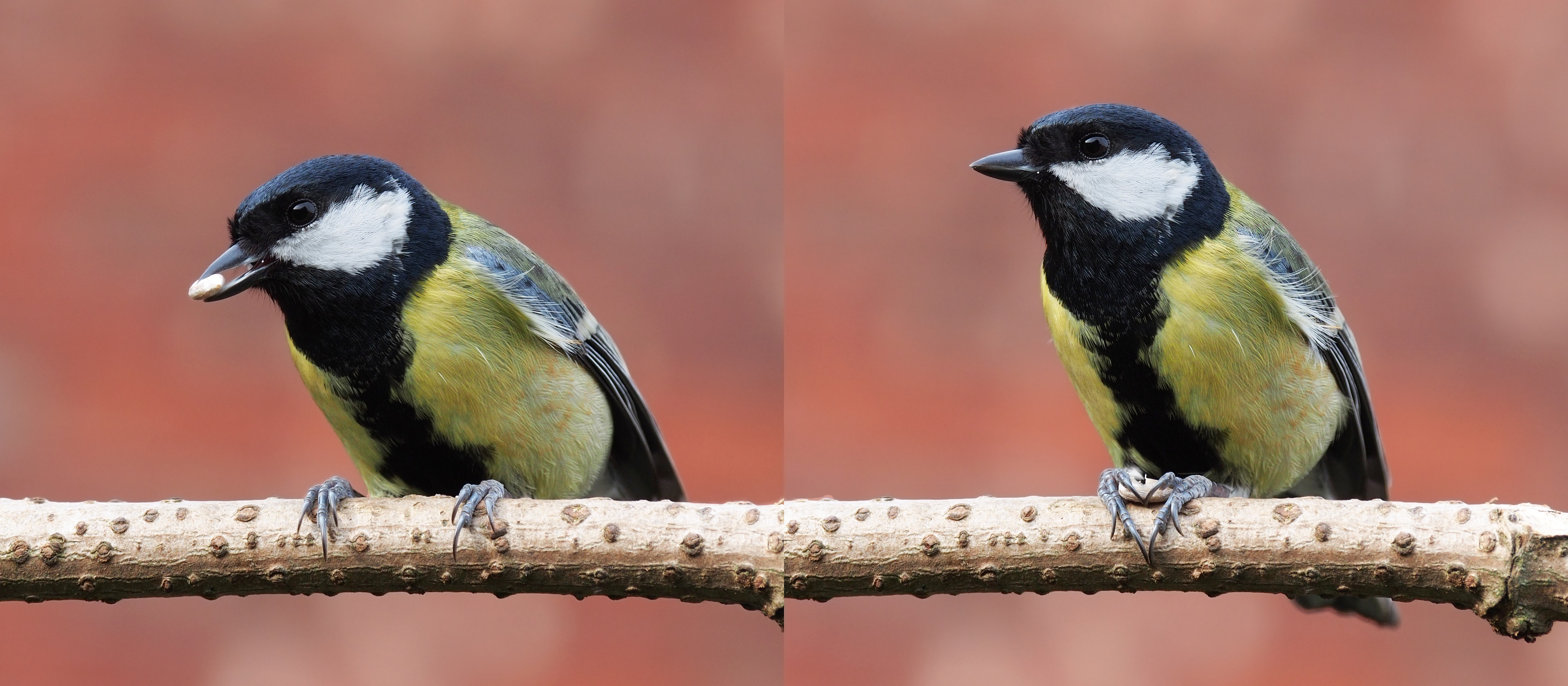
Like other tits, great tits transport food with their beak, and then transfer it to their feet, where it is held while they eat.

Great tits are primarily insectivorous in the summer, feeding on insects and spiders which they capture by foliage gleaning. Their larger invertebrate prey include cockroaches, grasshoppers and crickets, lacewings, earwigs, bugs (Hemiptera), ants, flies (Diptera), caddisflies, beetles, scorpionflies, harvestmen, bees and wasps, snails and woodlice. During the breeding season, the tits prefer to feed protein-rich caterpillars to their young. A study published in 2007 found that great tits helped to reduce caterpillar damage in apple orchards by as much as 50%. Nestlings also undergo a period in their early development where they are fed a number of spiders, possibly for nutritional reasons. In autumn and winter, when insect prey becomes scarcer, great tits add berries and seeds to their diet. Seeds and fruit usually come from deciduous trees and shrubs, like for instance the seeds of beech and hazel. Where it is available they will readily take table scraps, peanuts and seeds from bird tables. In particularly severe winters they may consume 44% of their body weight in sunflower seeds. They often forage on the ground, particularly in years with high beech mast production. Great tits, along with other tits, will join winter mixed-species foraging flocks.

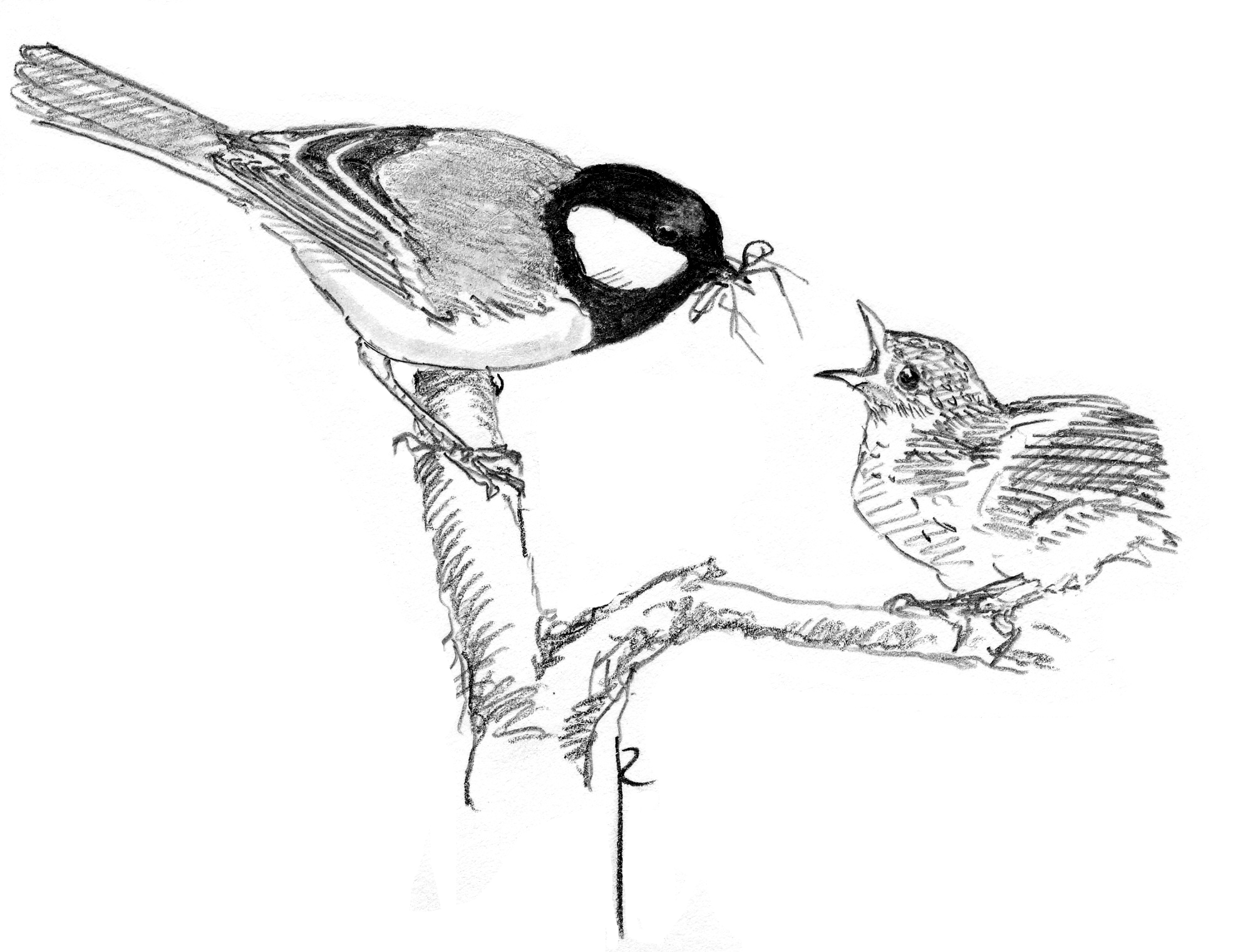
Great tit feeding its young with an insect

Large food items, such as large seeds or prey, are dealt with by "hold-hammering", where the item is held with one or both feet and then struck with the bill until it is ready to eat. Using this method, a great tit can get into a hazelnut in about twenty minutes. When feeding young, adults will hammer off the heads of large insects to make them easier to consume, and remove the gut from caterpillars so that the tannins in the gut will not retard the chick's growth.

Great tits combine dietary versatility with a considerable amount of intelligence and the ability to solve problems with insight learning, that is to solve a problem through insight rather than trial and error. In England, great tits learned to break the foil caps of milk bottles delivered at the doorstep of homes to obtain the cream at the top. This behaviour, first noted in 1921, spread rapidly in the next two decades. In 2009, great tits were reported killing, and eating the brains of roosting pipistrelle bats. This is the first time a songbird has been recorded preying on bats. The tits only do this during winter when the bats are hibernating and other food is scarce. They have also been recorded using tools, using a conifer needle in the bill to extract larvae from a hole in a tree.

=== Breeding ===
Great tits are monogamous breeders and establish breeding territories. These territories are established in late January and defence begins in late winter or early spring. Territories are usually reoccupied in successive years, even if one of the pair dies, so long as the brood is raised successfully. Females are likely to disperse to new territories if their nest is predated the previous year. If the pair divorces for some reason then the birds will disperse, with females travelling further than males to establish new territories. Although the great tit is socially monogamous, extra-pair copulations are frequent. One study in Germany found that 40% of nests contained some offspring fathered by parents other than the breeding male and that 8.5% of all chicks were the result of cuckoldry. Adult males tend to have a higher reproductive success compared to sub-adults.

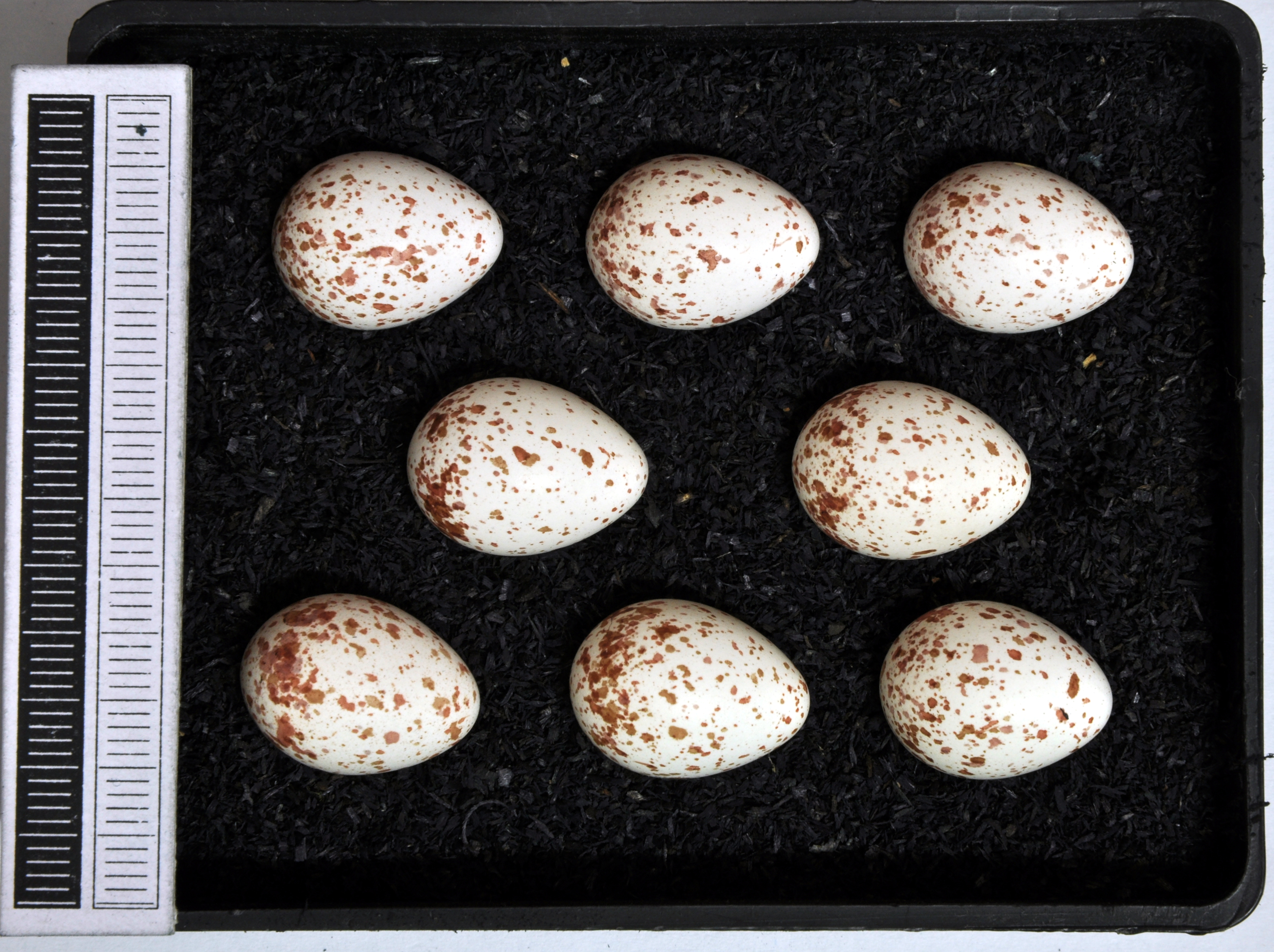
Eggs, Collection Museum Wiesbaden

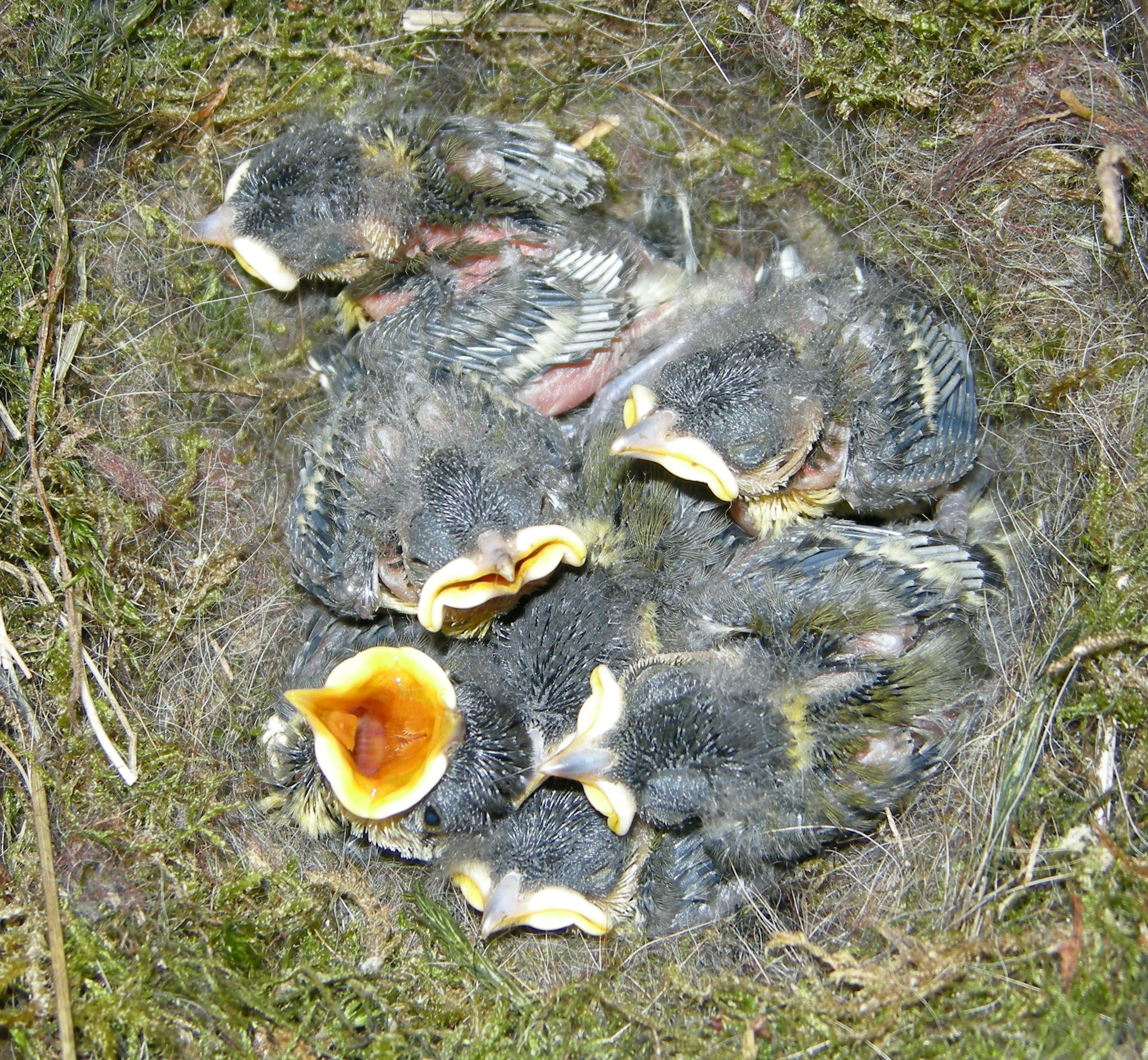
Young chicks in the nest

Great tits are seasonal breeders. The exact timing of breeding varies by a number of factors, most importantly location. Most breeding occurs between January and September; in Europe the breeding season usually begins after March. In Israel there are exceptional records of breeding during the months of October to December. The amount of sunlight and daytime temperatures will also affect breeding timing. One study found a strong correlation between the timing of laying and the peak abundance of caterpillar prey, which is in turn correlated to temperature. On an individual level, younger females tend to start laying later than older females.

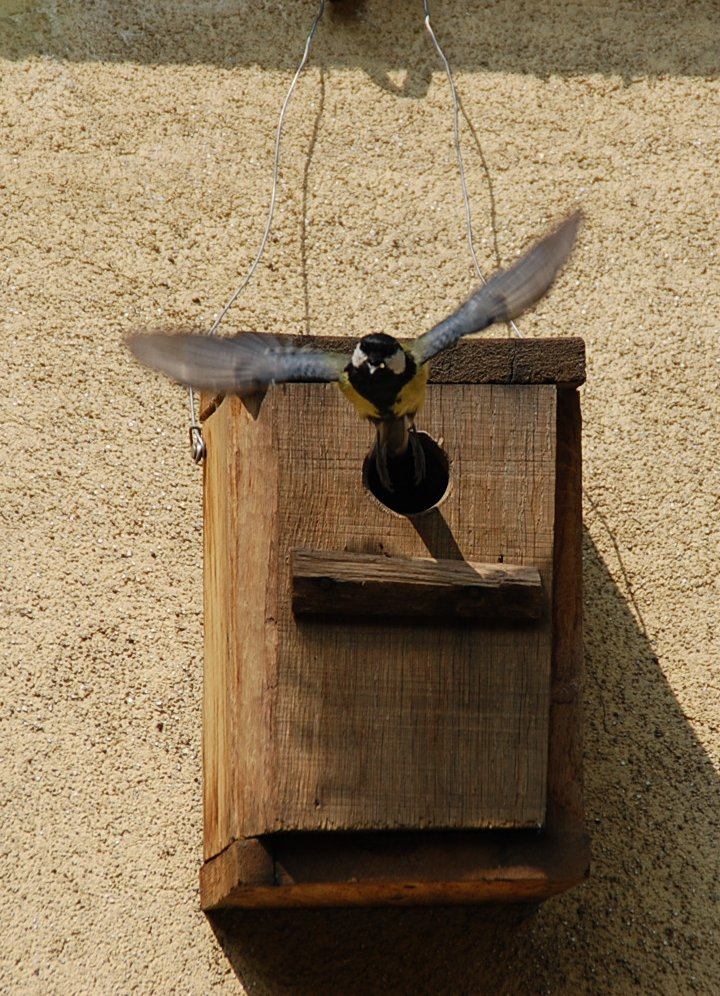
Leaving nest box

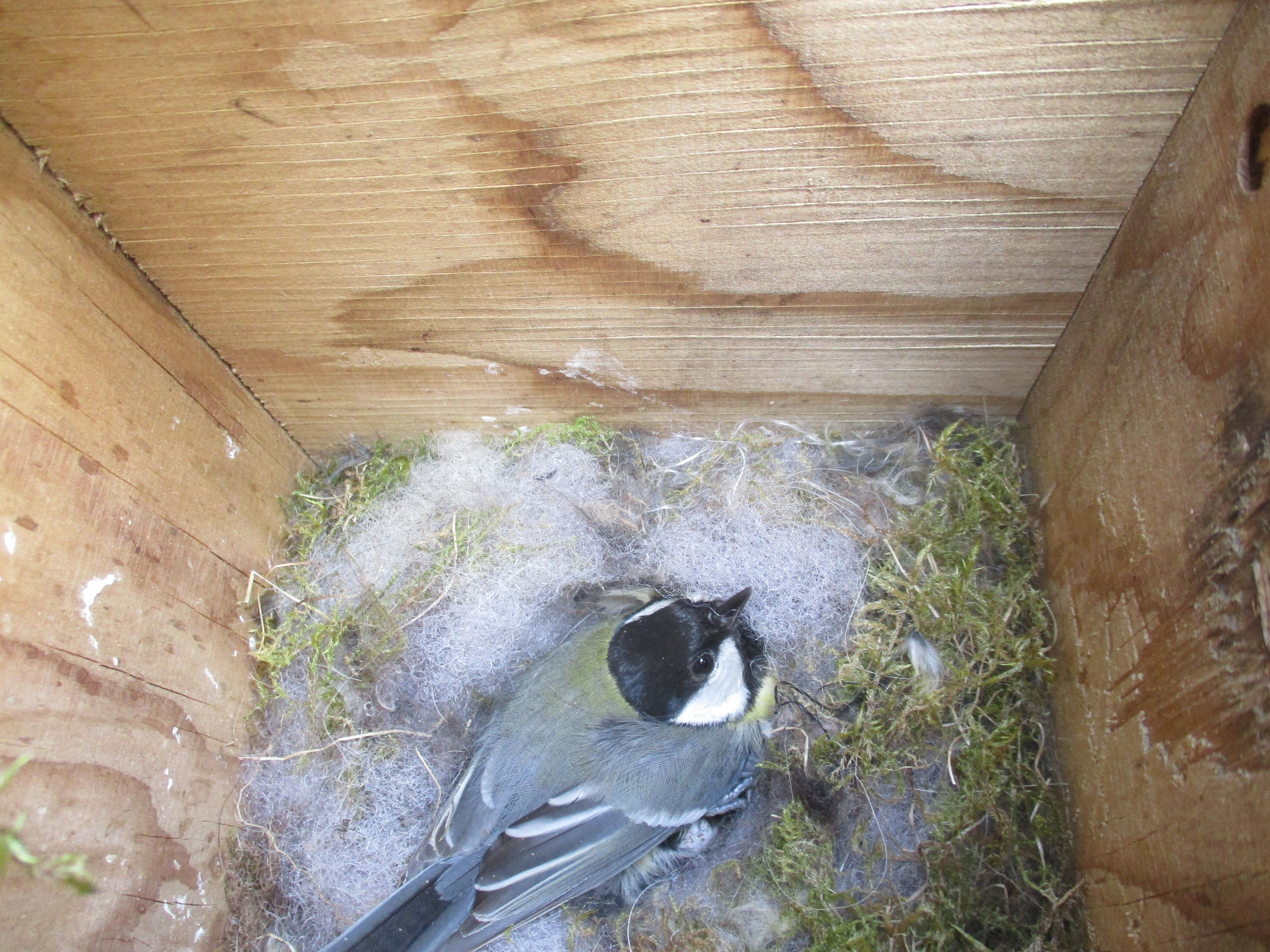
Great tit nesting in nest box

Great tits are cavity nesters, breeding in a hole that is usually inside a tree, although occasionally in a wall or rock face, and they will readily take to nest boxes. The nest inside the cavity is built by the female, and is made of plant fibres, grasses, moss, hair, wool and feathers. The number in the clutch is often very large, as many as 18, but five to twelve is more common. Clutch size is smaller when birds start laying later, and is also lower when the density of competitors is higher. Second broods tend to have smaller clutches. Insularity also affects clutch size, with great tits on offshore islands laying smaller clutches with larger eggs than mainland birds. The eggs are white with red spots. The female undertakes all incubation duties, and is fed by the male during incubation. The bird is a close sitter, hissing when disturbed. The timing of hatching, which is best synchronised with peak availability of prey, can be manipulated when environmental conditions change after the laying of the first egg by delaying the beginning of incubation, laying more eggs or pausing during incubation. The incubation period is between 12 and 15 days.

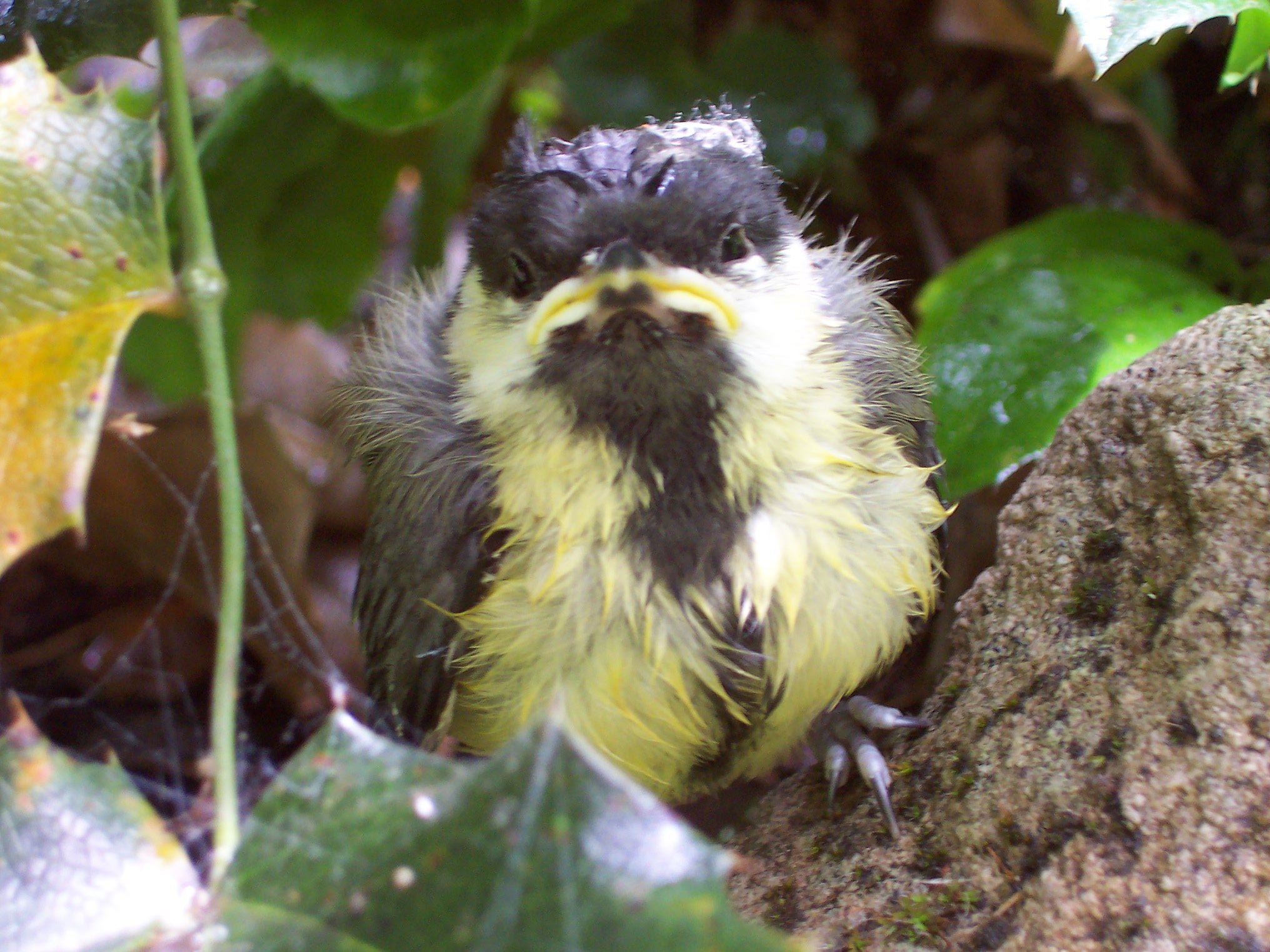
Fledgling

The chicks, like those of all tits, hatch unfeathered and blind. Once their feathers begin to grow, the nestlings are unusual among altricial birds in that their plumage is coloured with carotenoids similar to that of their parents. In most species, the plumage is dun-coloured to avoid predation. The nape is yellow and attracts the attention of the parents by its ultraviolet reflectance. This may be to make them easier to find in low light, or be a signal of fitness to win the parents' attention. This patch turns white after the first moult at age two months, and diminishes in size as the bird grows.

Chicks are fed by both parents, usually receiving 6 to 7 g (0.21–0.25 oz) of food a day. Both parents provision the chicks with food and aid in nest sanitation by removing faecal packets, with no difference in the feeding effort between the sexes. The nestling period is between 16 and 22 days, with chicks being independent of the parents eight days after fledging. Feeding of the fledgling may continue after independence, lasting up to 25 days in chicks from the first brood, but as long as 50 days in the second brood. Nestlings from second broods have weaker immune systems and body condition than those from first broods, and hence have a lower juvenile survival rate.

Inbreeding depression occurs when the offspring produced as a result of a mating between close relatives show reduced fitness. The reduced fitness is generally considered to be a consequence of the increased expression of deleterious recessive alleles in these offspring. In natural populations of P. major, inbreeding is avoided by dispersal of individuals from their birthplace, which reduces the chance of mating with a close relative.

=== Ecology ===
The Eurasian sparrowhawk is a predator of great tits, with the young from second broods being at higher risk partly because of the hawk's greater need for food for its own developing young. The nests of great tits are raided by great spotted woodpeckers, particularly when nesting in certain types of nest boxes. Other nest predators include introduced grey squirrels (in Britain) and least weasels, which are able to take nesting adults as well. A species of biting louse (Mallophaga) described as Rostrinirmus hudeci was isolated and described in 1981 from great tits in central Europe. The hen flea Ceratophyllus gallinae is exceedingly common in the nests of blue and great tits. It was originally a specialist tit flea, but the dry, crowded conditions of chicken runs enabled it to flourish with its new host. This flea is preferentially predated by the clown beetle Gnathoncus punctulatus, The rove beetle Microglotta pulla also feeds on fleas and their larvae. Although these beetles often remain in deserted nests, they can only breed in the elevated temperatures produced by brooding birds, tits being the preferred hosts. Great tits compete with the pied flycatcher for nesting boxes, and can kill prospecting flycatcher males. Incidences of fatal competition are more frequent when nesting times overlap, and climate change has led to greater synchrony of nesting between the two species and flycatcher deaths. Having killed the flycatchers, the great tits may consume their brains.

== Physiology ==
Great tits have been found to possess special physiological adaptations for cold environments. When preparing for winter months, the great tit can increase how thermogenic (heat producing) its blood is. The mechanism for this adaptation is a seasonal increase in mitochondrial volume and mitochondrial respiration in red blood cells and increased uncoupling of the electron transport from adenosine triphosphate (ATP) production. As a result, the energy that would have been used to make ATP is released as heat and their blood becomes more thermogenic. In the face of winter food shortages, the great tit has also shown a type of peripheral vasoconstriction (constriction of blood vessels) to reduce heat loss and cold injury. Reduced cold injury and heat loss is mediated by the great tits' counter-current vascular arrangements, and peripheral vasoconstriction in major vessels in and around the birds' bill and legs. This mechanism allows uninsulated regions (i.e., bill and legs) to remain close to the surrounding temperature. In response to food restriction, the great tits' bill temperature dropped, and once food availably was increased, bill temperatures gradually returned to normal. Vasoconstriction of blood vessels in the bill not only serves as an energy saving mechanism, but also reduces the amount of heat transferred from core body tissues to the skin (via cutaneous vasodilation), which, in turn, reduces heat loss rate by lowering skin temperature relative to the environment.

== Relationship with humans ==
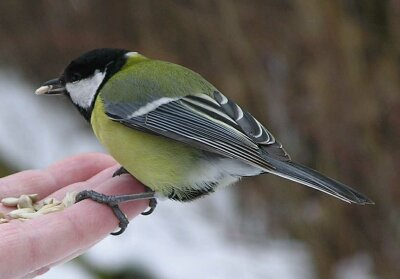
The great tit's willingness to use bird-feeders and nesting boxes makes it popular with the general public and useful to scientists.

The great tit is a popular garden bird due to its acrobatic performances when feeding on nuts or seed. Its willingness to move into nest boxes has made it a valuable study subject in ornithology; it has been particularly useful as a model for the study of the evolution of various life-history traits, particularly clutch size. A study of a literature database search found 1,349 articles relating to Parus major for the period between 1969 and 2002.

The great tit has generally adjusted to human modifications of the environment. It is more common and has better breeding success in areas with undisturbed forest cover, but it has adapted well to human-modified habitats, and can be very common in urban areas. For example, the breeding population in the city of Sheffield (a city of half a million people) has been estimated at some 17,000 individuals. In adapting to human environments its song has been observed to change in noise-polluted urban environments. In areas with low frequency background noise pollution, the song has a higher frequency than in quieter areas. This tit has expanded its range, moving northwards into Scandinavia and Scotland, and south into Israel and Egypt. As of 2016, the total population is estimated at between 300 and 1,100 million birds in a range of 32.4 million km^{2} (12.5 million sq mi). While there have been some localised declines in population in areas with poorer quality habitats, its large range and high numbers mean that the great tit is not considered to be threatened, and it is classed as least concern on the IUCN Red List.
