= Fenichel =

Fenichel is a surname. Notable people with this surname include:

- Eli Fenichel, American economist
- Haimi Fenichel (born 1972), Israeli artist
- Lilly Fenichel (1927–2016), Austrian-born American painter
- Max Fenichel (1885–1942), Austrian photographer
- Neil Fenichel, mathematician who introduced the normally hyperbolic invariant manifold
- Otto Fenichel (1897–1946), Austrian psychoanalyst
- Sámuel Fenichel (1868–1893), Hungarian explorer
