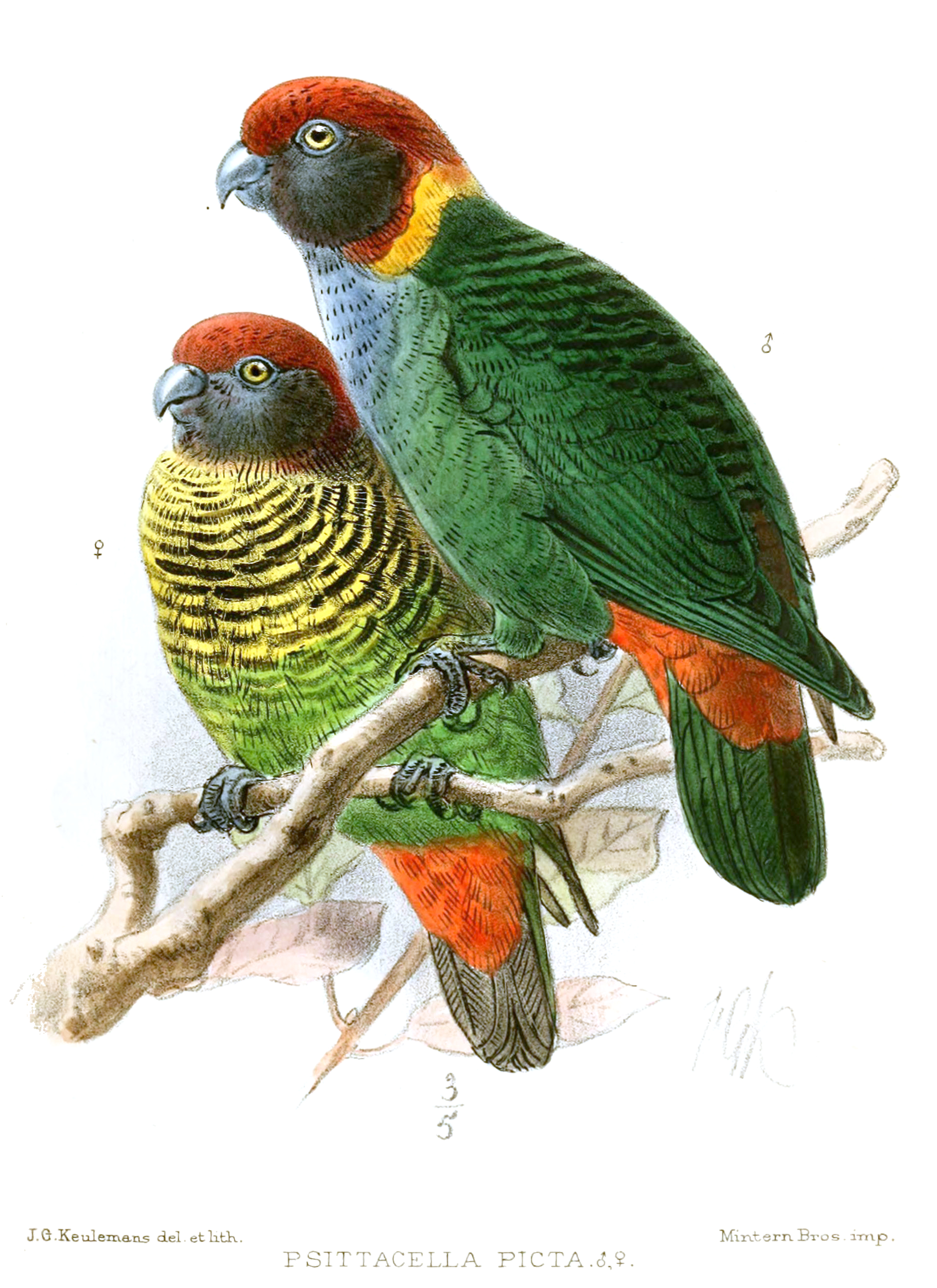

Conservation status
- Least Concern (IUCN 3.1)

Scientific classification
- Kingdom: Animalia
- Phylum: Chordata
- Class: Aves
- Order: Psittaciformes
- Family: Psittaculidae
- Genus: Psittacella
- Species: P. picta

Binomial name
- Psittacella picta Rothschild, 1896

= Painted tiger parrot =

Species of bird

The painted tiger parrot (Psittacella picta) is a species of parrot in the family Psittaculidae. It is mainly found in Papua New Guinea.

== Description ==
The painted tiger parrot has green wings and tail, red cap, yellow eye, red rump and tiger stripes on its back and belly.

== Distribution & population ==
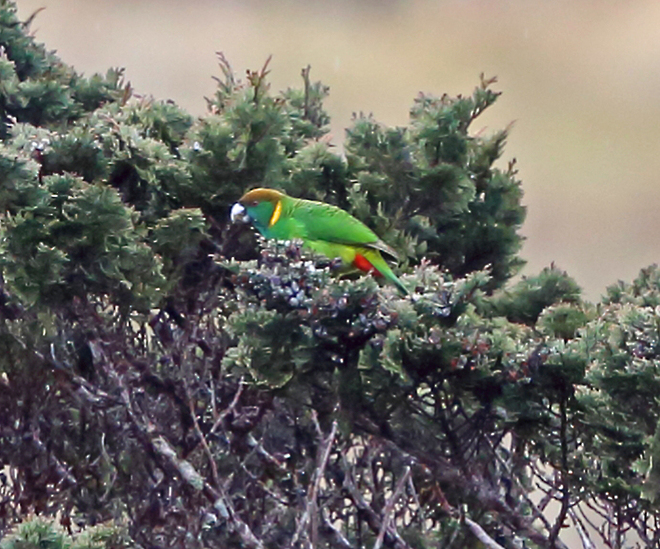
ssp. lorentzi

The total population of the painted tiger parrot is unknown, but wildlife surveys indicate that the population is stable and locally common. It is found throughout much of the Bismarck Range and Owen Stanley Range in the provinces of Western Province, Hela Province, Enga Province, Southern Highlands Province, Western Highlands Province, Chimbu Province, Eastern Highlands Province, Morobe Province, Central Province, Oro Province, and Milne Bay Province.

== Ecology ==
The painted tiger parrot occurs in montane and subalpine forests and shrub at elevations of 2,400-4,000 m. Often, this species is seen in cautiously feeding in low bushes, eating a variety of seeds, berries, and small fruits of dacrydium conifers. It is also known to feed alongside Madarasz's tiger parrot. When startled, it flies into the canopy. This species is usually seen in pairs of groups of up to six birds.
