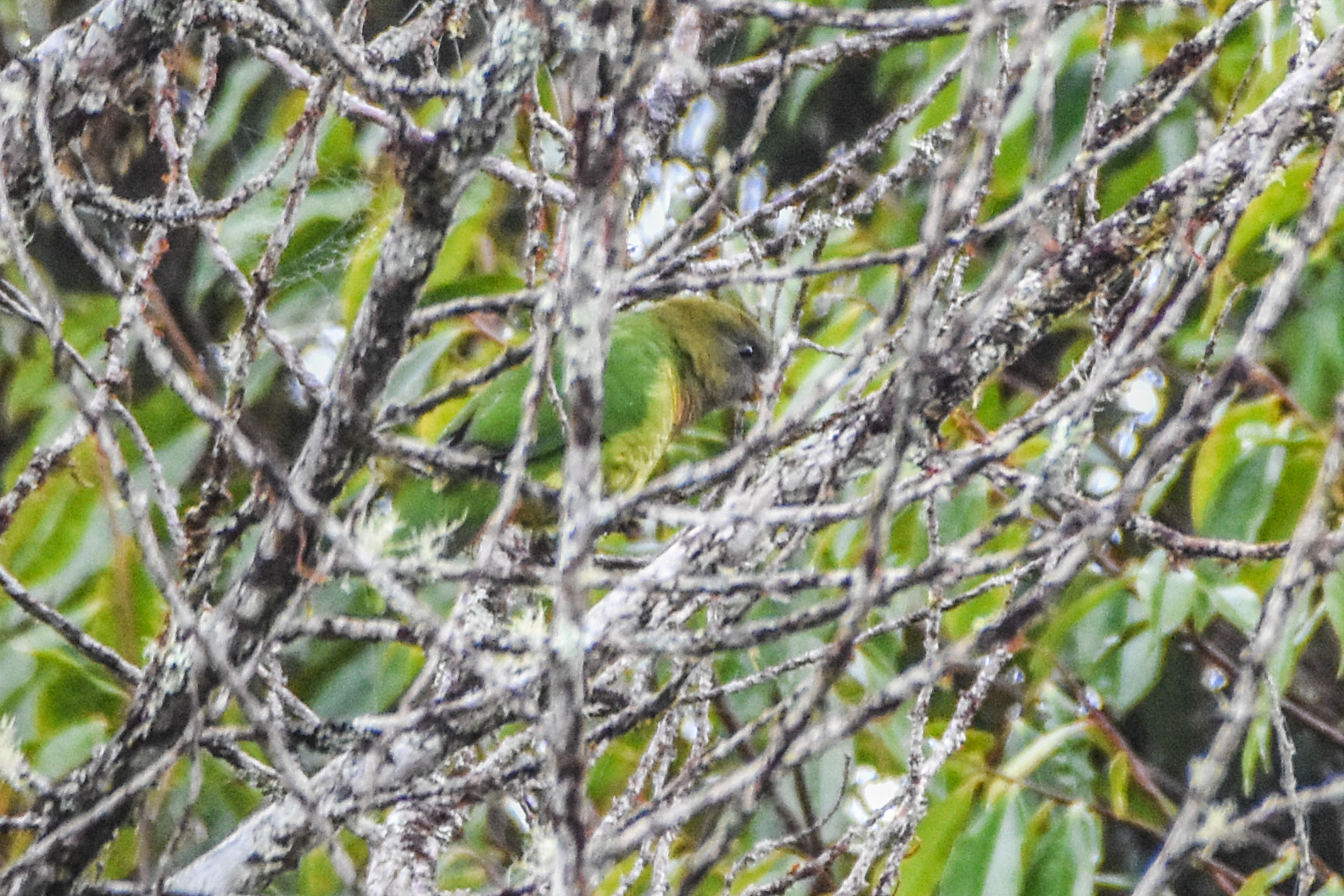

Conservation status
- Least Concern (IUCN 3.1)

Scientific classification
- Kingdom: Animalia
- Phylum: Chordata
- Class: Aves
- Order: Psittaciformes
- Family: Psittaculidae
- Genus: Psittacella
- Species: P. modesta

Binomial name
- Psittacella modesta Schlegel, 1871

= Modest tiger parrot =

Species of bird

The modest tiger parrot (Psittacella modesta) is a species of parrot in the family Psittaculidae. It is found in the Arfak Mountains and New Guinea Highlands. Its natural habitat is subtropical or tropical moist montane forests.
