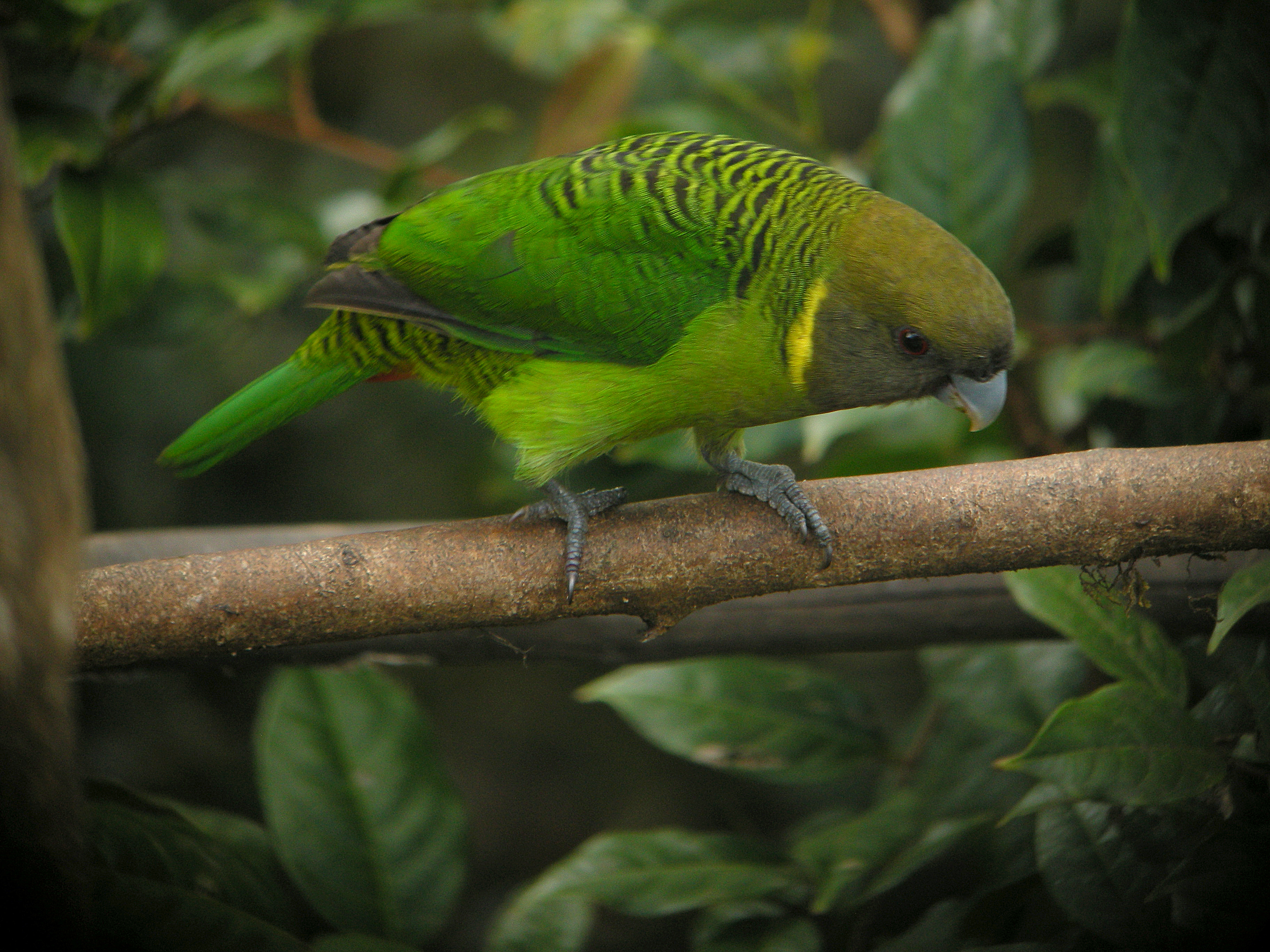
- Male Brehm's tiger parrot

Scientific classification
- Kingdom: Animalia
- Phylum: Chordata
- Class: Aves
- Order: Psittaciformes
- Family: Psittaculidae
- Subfamily: Psittacellinae
- Genus: Psittacella; Schlegel, 1871

Species
- Four; see text

= Tiger parrot =

Genus of birds

Tiger parrots are members of the genus Psittacella (the only genus in the subfamily Psittacellinae) in the family Psittaculidae, named for their tiger-striped backs. Established by Hermann Schlegel in 1871, the genus contains the following four species, all of which are endemic to the island of New Guinea.

Image	Common name	Scientific name
	Madarasz's tiger parrot	Psittacella madaraszi
	Modest tiger parrot	Psittacella modesta
	Painted tiger parrot	Psittacella picta
	Brehm's tiger parrot	Psittacella brehmii

The Brehm's tiger parrot is a small, green colored parrot, and is the largest species in the Psittacella genus. It measures to be around 24cm in length and weighs between 94 and 120g. Their diet consists primarily of seeds and berries.
