= Gyula Madarász =

Hungarian ornithologist and nature artist

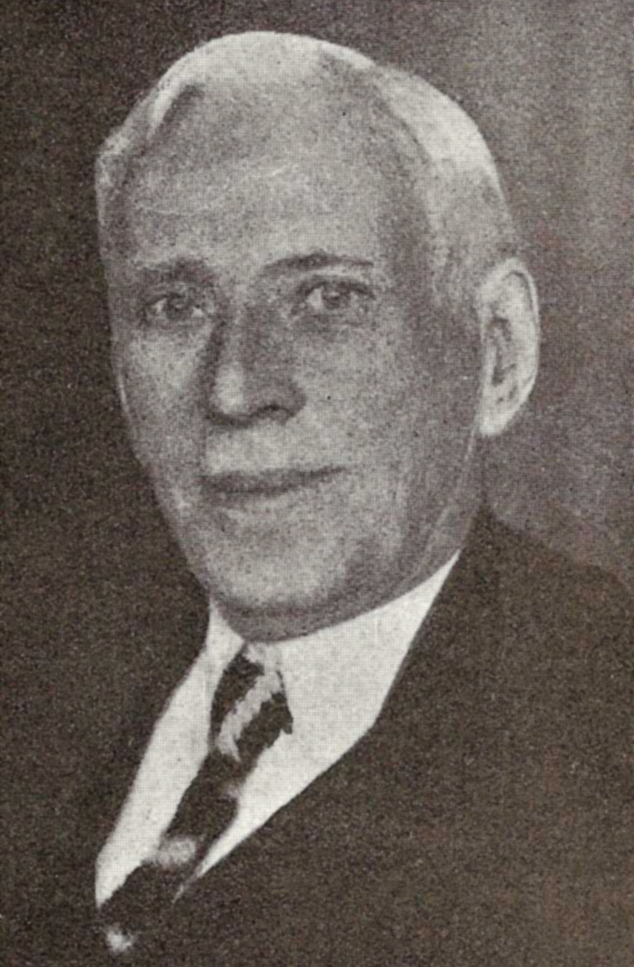

Gyula János István Madarász (3 May 1858 – 29 December 1931), also known as Julius von Madarász or Julius Madarász von Nemeskisfalud, was a Hungarian ornithologist and nature artist, who worked at the Hungarian National Museum. He founded several Hungarian bird journals and a number of subspecies of bird carry his name, including Chloris chloris madaraszi, Colluricincla megarhyncha madaraszi, Eremopterix leucotis madaraszi, Xanthotis flaviventer madaraszi. A parrot species Psittacella madaraszi is also named after him.

== Early life and education ==
Born in Pest, Madarász came from a wealthy family of minor nobility. His parents were Zsigmond Ede Madarász who had studied law and Szerafine Szabadffy. Because he was financially independent, he could devote his entire life to scientific work. He went to the Catholic Gymnasium in Pest and then the Piarist Gymnasium in Budapest (1877). After that he attended the University of Budapest, first studying medicine, and then zoology. In 1880, he completed a doctoral thesis on the anatomy of birds of the family Paridae under professor Tivadar Margó (1816–1896).

== Scientific career ==
Starting in 1879, Madarász was an employee of the Hungarian National Museum. He worked there until his retirement in 1915, ultimately serving as the director of the ornithology department. During his tenure, he vastly increased the size of the collection through his own efforts and through purchases. Madarász travelled to every part of Hungary over the course of his career, and authored a number of authoritative works on the birds of central Europe. At Lake Fertő, he regularly observed avian migrations. In 1881, he created a checklist of the birds of Hungary. In 1884, he founded the German-language ornithological journal Zeitschrift für die gesamte Ornithologie, which he published and edited for five years, as well as contributing to the wealth of illustrations that it contained. From 1894 to 1893, he published Magyarország Madarai, a comprehensive and well-illustrated encyclopedia of Hungarian birds, that remained an important reference for decades.

In 1891 he was involved in organizing the 2nd International Ornithological Congress in Budapest along with István Chernel.

Madarász also undertook collecting trips and expeditions around western Europe, Asia, Africa, and South America, making him one of the first Hungarian ornithologists to extend his studies beyond the local avifauna. On an 1895–96 expedition to Ceylon, he collected specimens of at least 125 species. In 1911–12, he travelled through Sudan to the Blue Nile, but he had to cut the trip short when he came down with malaria. He published a monograph entitled The Birds of Cyprus in 1904, and wrote several publications cataloging the birds collected by an expedition led by Sámuel Fenichel and Lajos Bíró in New Guinea. He described several species collected by him and by other ornithologists, among these species the green-breasted pitta and Szechenyi's monal-partridge. In total, he published over 150 ornithological works. Madarász was a Foreign Member of the British Ornithologists' Union and a Corresponding Fellow of the American Ornithologists' Union.

In 1915 he was asked to retire from the museum by Géza Horváth and he severed all ties with the Hungarian National Museum.

A species of bird, Madarasz's tiger parrot (Psittacella madaraszi), was named after Gyula Madarász by Adolf Bernhard Meyer in 1886.

== Artistic work ==
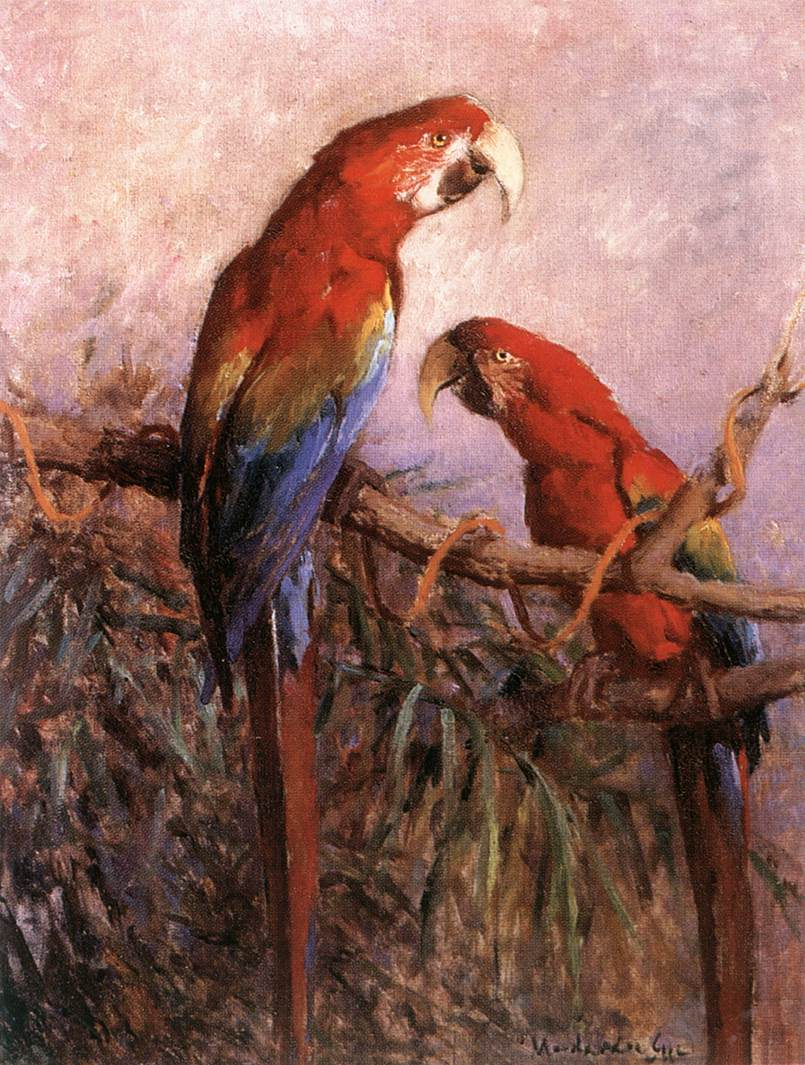
A painting of macaws by Madarász

Madarász was tutored in painting by Antal Ligeti, who also worked at the Hungarian National Museum. Madarász's landscape paintings and paintings of animals were exhibited in the National Salon and National Art Gallery in Budapest, and he also mostly illustrated his ornithological articles and books himself. He also married his daughter Margit in 1883. They divorced in 1894 and he married Maria Reichel (1877–1954) in 1894 (after whom he named Bradypterus lopezi mariae). After divorcing in 1919 he married Rozália Kolarits.

He died in Budapest after a long illness and he was buried in the Kerepesi Cemetery.
