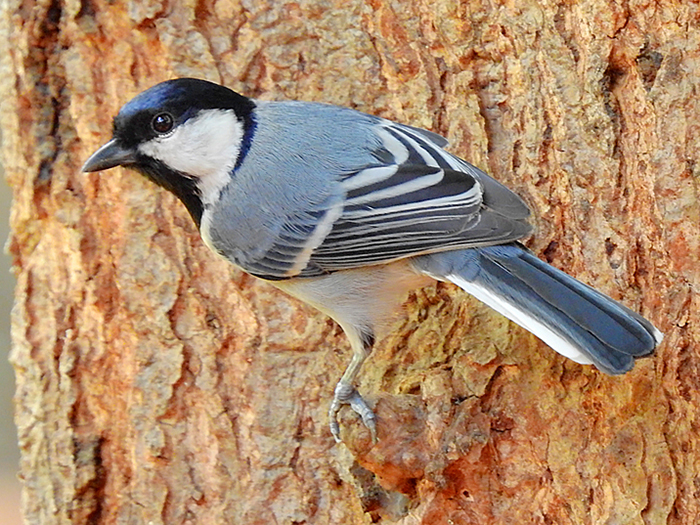

Scientific classification
- Kingdom: Animalia
- Phylum: Chordata
- Class: Aves
- Order: Passeriformes
- Family: Paridae
- Genus: Parus
- Species: P. cinereus

Binomial name
- Parus cinereus Vieillot, 1818
- Distribution of related species based on Eck & Martens (2006)

Synonyms
- Parus major (pro parte); Parus atriceps

= Cinereous tit =

Species of bird

Several cinereous tits at a bird bath in Kanagawa, Japan

The cinereous tit or Asian tit (Parus cinereus) is a species of bird in the tit family Paridae. This species is made up of several populations that were earlier treated as subspecies of the great tit (Parus major). These birds are grey backed with white undersides. The great tit in the new sense is distinguishable by the greenish-back and yellowish underside. The distribution of this species extends from parts of West Asia across South Asia and into Southeast Asia. The Japanese tit was formerly treated as a separate species but is now grouped together with the cinereous tit.

== Taxonomy ==
The cinereous tit was formally described in 1818 by the French ornithologist Louis Vieillot under the binomial name Parus cinereus. He specified the type location as Batavia, now Jakarta, on the Indonesian island of Java. The cinereous tit was formerly considered as conspecific with the great tit (Parus major).

Twenty subspecies are recognised:

- P. c. decolorans Koelz, 1939 – northeast Afghanistan and northwest Pakistan
- P. c. ziaratensis Whistler, 1929 – central, south Afghanistan and west Pakistan
- P. c. caschmirensis Hartert, EJO, 1905 – northeast Afghanistan, north Pakistan and northwest India
- P. c. planorum Hartert, EJO, 1905 – north India to Nepal, Bhutan, Bangladesh and west, central Myanmar
- P. c. vauriei Ripley, 1950 – northeast India
- P. c. stupae Koelz, 1939 – west, central, southeast India
- P. c. mahrattarum Hartert, EJO, 1905 – southwest India and Sri Lanka
- P. c. templorum Meyer de Schauensee, 1946 – west, central Thailand and south Indochina
- P. c. hainanus Hartert, EJO, 1905 – Hainan (off southeast China)
- P. c. ambiguus (Raffles, 1822) – Malay Peninsula and Sumatra
- P. c. sarawacensis Slater, HH, 1885 – Borneo
- P. c. cinereus Vieillot, 1818 – Java and Lesser Sunda Islands (except Timor and far east)
- P. c. minor Temminck & Schlegel, 1848 – east Siberia, south Sakhalin, central east, northeast China, Korea Peninsula and Japan
- P. c. dageletensis Kuroda & Nm & Mori, 1920 – island of Ulleungdo (off South Korea)
- P. c. amamiensis Kleinschmidt, 1922 – north Ryukyu Islands
- P. c. okinawae Hartert, EJO, 1905 – central Ryukyu Islands
- P. c. nigriloris Hellmayr, 1900 – islands of Ishigaki and Iriomote (Yaeyama Islands, south Ryukyu Islands, south Japan)
- P. c. tibetanus Hartert, EJO, 1905 – southeast Tibet, southwest, central south China to north Myanmar
- P. c. commixtus Swinhoe, 1868 – south China and north Vietnam
- P. c. nubicolus Meyer de Schauensee, 1946 – east Myanmar, north Thailand and northwest Indochina

The final eight subspecies on the above list (beginning with P. c. minor) were formerly treated as a separate species, the Japanese tit (Parus minor). The Japanese tit was lumped with the cinereous tit based on molecular phylogenetic studies that found it is more appropriate to consider the Parus major complex as comprising two species, the cinereous tit and the great tit, rather than three.

== Description ==
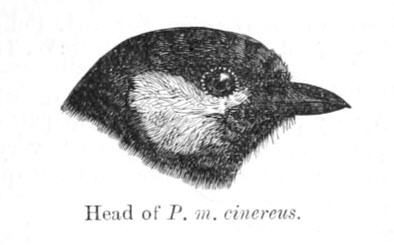
Head pattern

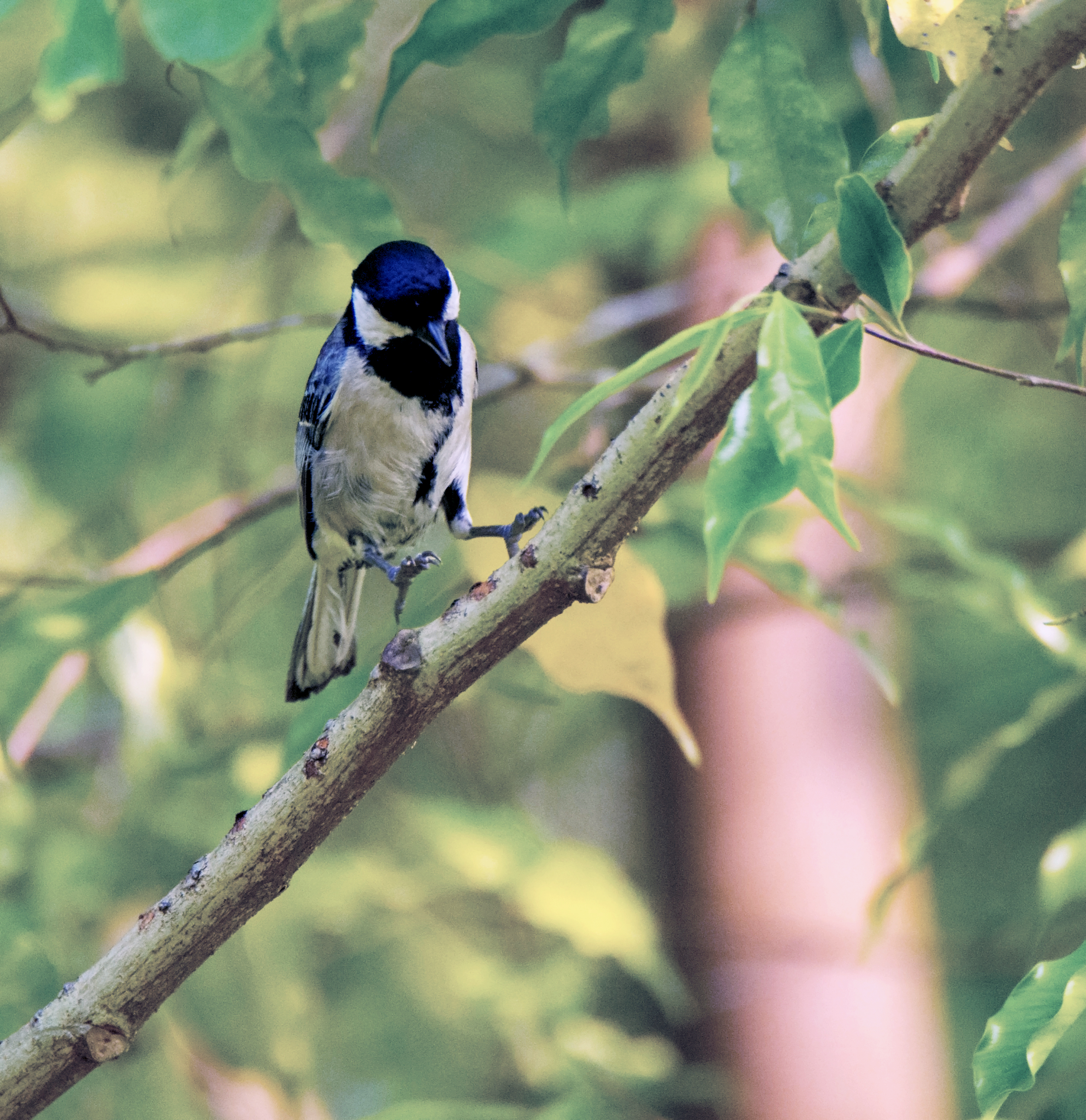
Cinereous tit in Kadigarh National Park, Bhaluka, Mymensingh District, Bangladesh.

Like others in the genus, it has a broad black ventral line and has no crest. This tit is part of a confusing group of species but is distinct in having a grey-back, black hood, white cheek patch and a white wing-bar. The underparts are white with the black central stripe running along the length. The female has a narrower ventral line and is slightly duller. The upper tail coverts are ashy while the tail is black with the central 4 pairs of feathers ashy on the outer webs and all but the central pair are tipped white. The fifth pair is white with a black rachis and a band of black on the inner web. The outermost pair of tail feathers are all white with a black shaft. The undertail coverts are black towards the centre but white on the sides.

Several of the subspecies formerly placed within Parus major are now placed in this species (all of which have a grey rather than greenish back as adults, although young birds show some green on the back and yellowish on the underside ). These geographically separated populations show differences mainly in the shade of grey, the extent of white on the tail feathers and in size, although the variation in size is mainly clinal.

== Behaviour and ecology ==
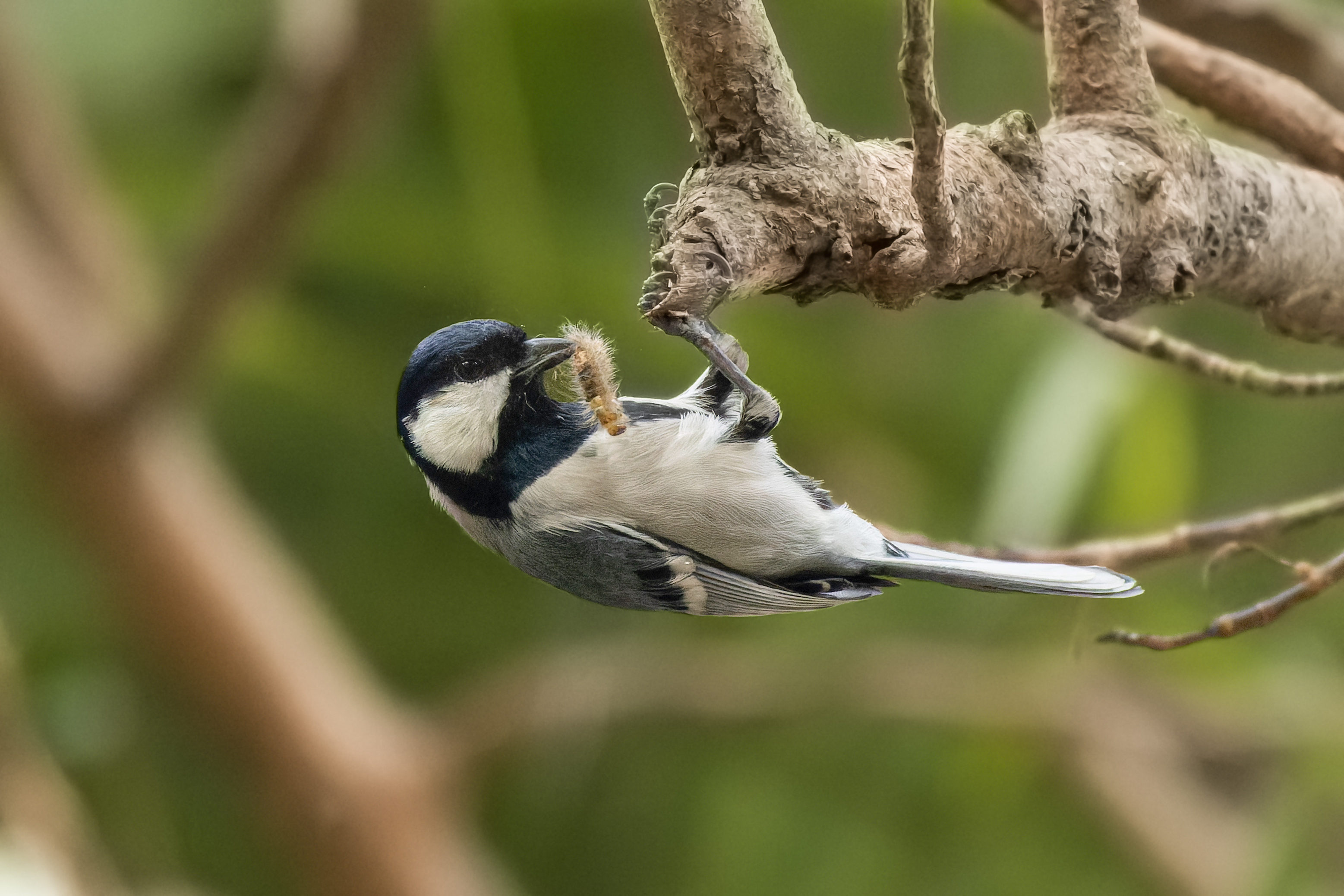
Parus cinereus eating a caterpillar in Rabindra Sarobar

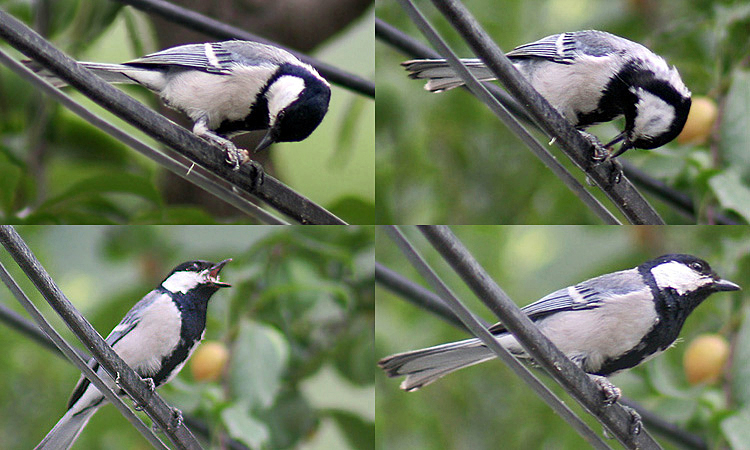
An individual using its feet to hold food

These birds are usually seen in pairs or small groups that sometimes join mixed-species foraging flocks. They forage mainly by gleaning, capturing insects (mainly caterpillars, bugs and beetles) that are disturbed and will also feeding on buds and fruits. They sometimes use their feet to hold insects which are then torn with their beak. They may also wedge hard seeds in a bark crevice before hammering them with their beak (noted in ssp. caschmirensis).)

The calls are a whistling titiweesi...titiweesi... witsi-seesee or other variants repeated three of four times followed by a break. The calling is particularly persistent during the breeding season. In playback experiments, the churring alarm calls of the European Parus major and Asian species are responded to by each other but the songs of the European species do not elicit much response in P. c. mahrattarum. About 4 to 6 eggs form the normal clutch (9 recorded in caschmirensis with one case of two nests side by side). The breeding season is summer and but dates vary across their range. Some birds may raise more than one brood. In southern India and Sri Lanka the breeding season is February to May (mainly before the Monsoons) but nests have also been seen from September to November. The nests are placed in hollows in trees or in a wall or mud-bank with a narrow entrance hole and the floor of the cavity is lined with moss, hair and feathers. They sometimes make use of the old nest of a woodpecker or barbet. Both parents take part in incubation and hissing from within the nest when threatened. They may also roost in cavities such as those in cut bamboo.

A species of flea Ceratophyllus gallinae has been recorded in their nests from India.

Vocalisations of the cinereous tit (P. c. minor) have been shown to encode messages such as "scan surroundings" or "approach", which can be combined to transmit compound messages. The order of these messages is meaningful, which has led researchers to liken the ordering of calls to syntax and grammar in human language. These birds have also been shown to create mental images for the call used to signal the presence of a snake, a cognitive ability that had previously been only attested in humans.
