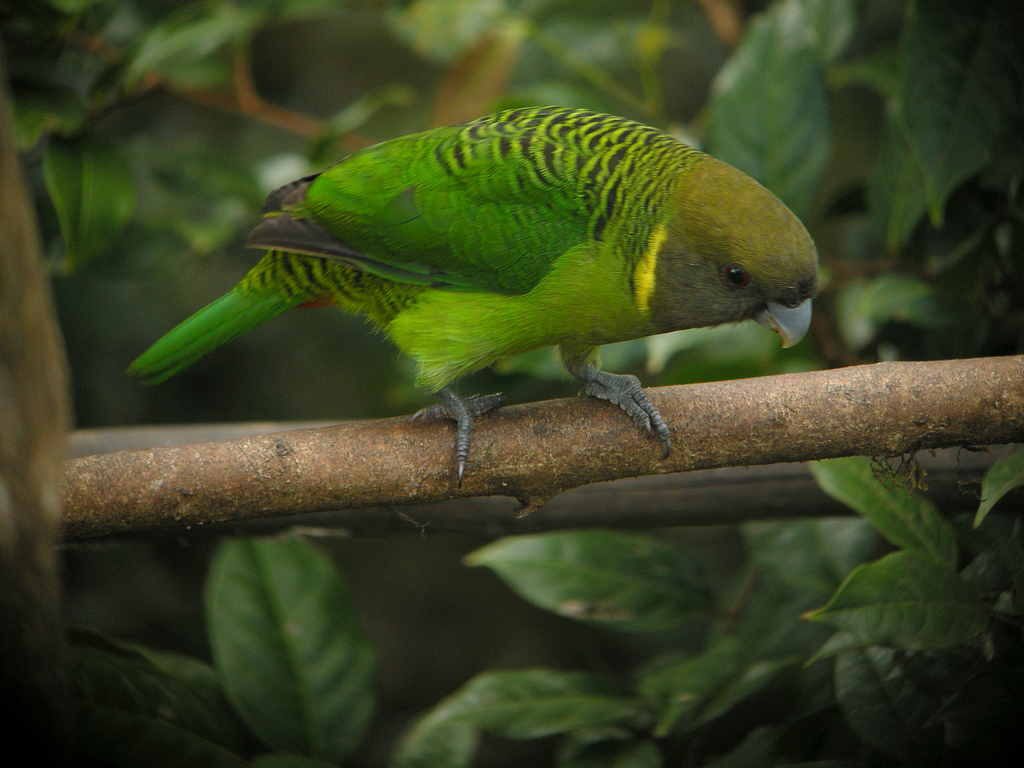
- Male in Papua New Guinea
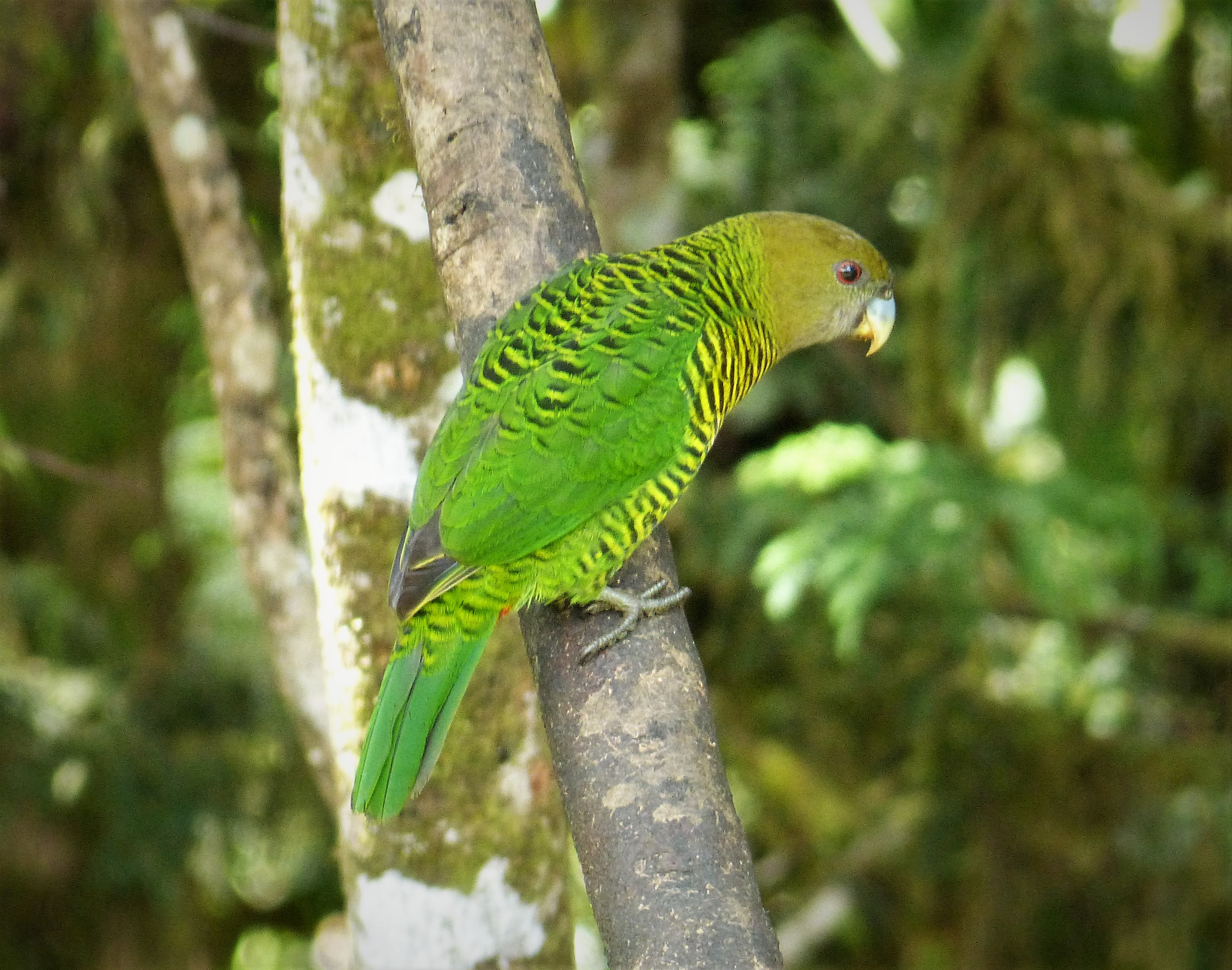
- Female in Papua New Guinea

Conservation status
- Least Concern (IUCN 3.1)

Scientific classification
- Kingdom: Animalia
- Phylum: Chordata
- Class: Aves
- Order: Psittaciformes
- Family: Psittaculidae
- Genus: Psittacella
- Species: P. brehmii

Binomial name
- Psittacella brehmii Schlegel, 1871

= Brehm's tiger parrot =

Species of bird

Brehm's tiger parrot (Psittacella brehmii), also known as Brehm's ground parrot, is a small mainly green parrot found in the highlands of New Guinea, from 1,500-2,600m (extremes 1,100-3,800m). The species is named after Alfred Brehm (1829–1884), a German traveller and collector.

== Taxonomy ==
There are four subspecies occurring in three distinct populations:

- P. b. brehmii: Bird's Head Peninsula, West Papua.
- P. b. intermixta: Central highlands of New Guinea. Underparts and barring on back more yellowish-green. Larger.
- P. b. pallida: SE highlands of New Guinea. Like nominate but narrower bill.
- P. b. harterti: Huon Peninsula (NE New Guinea). Paler head, less yellowish-green. Smaller.

In Brehm's central range the Painted Tiger parrot, P. picta, takes over above 2700m, but that species is not found in the Huon range, where Brehm's ranges higher. They are found singly or in small groups and feed on seeds and berries in the sub-canopy or near ground level.

== Description ==
Brehm's tiger parrot is the largest species in the genus Psittacella and is about 24 cm (9.4 in) in length and weighs between 94 and 120 g (3.3 and 4.2 oz). It is mainly green with a dull olive-brown head, transverse yellow and black bars on the back and rump, and red undertail coverts. Its irises are red, and its beak is blueish-grey fading to white at the tip. Its legs are grey. The male has a yellow stripe on the sides of its neck and a green breast without barring. Females lack the yellow stripe on the neck and have a yellow and black striped breast. Juveniles resemble females, but have yellowish-brown irises and a more faded green and pale-yellow barring on the breast. These quite parrots are once in a while found in aviculture and there have been no recorded reproducing successes. They are extremely susceptible; once in a while enduring more than 2 to 3 months in captivity. Minimum aviary measurements: 2.5 x 1 x 2 m (8 x 3 x 6 ft). Temperature ought to be controlled within the range of their normal natural surroundings (not very high, not very low).

== Cited texts ==
- Forshaw, Joseph M. (2006). Parrots of the World; an Identification Guide. Illustrated by Frank Knight. Princeton University Press. ISBN 0-691-09251-6.
