= Beau Geste hypothesis =

Hypothesis to explain bird song repertoires

The Beau Geste hypothesis in animal behaviour is the hypothesis that tries to explain why some avian species have such elaborate song repertoires for the purpose of territorial defence. The hypothesis takes its name from the 1924 book Beau Geste and was coined by John Krebs in 1977.

== Background ==
The Beau Geste hypothesis which was coined by Krebs in 1977 to explain why various avian species have such large song repertories. The hypothesis discusses that avian species utilize such large song repertories for potentially a number of reasons such as for territorial defence and to test the competition within a new habitat.

The name of the hypothesis comes from the book which was originally published in 1924 "Beau Geste". The book tells the story of three English brothers which all enlisted in the French Foreign Legion and ended up in a desert battle against a Tuareg army. They were greatly outnumbered, and in order to create the illusion that they had more men than they actually had, they took whatever dead soldiers they could find and propped them up along the walls of the fortress.

== Non-avian species ==
There has been mention of this hypothesis in places such as research into amphibian vocalizations in the Boophis madagascariensis, an endemic species of tree frog found in Madagascar, where the Beau Geste hypothesis is used to give one explanation of why the species has such a large vocal repertoire. There has been some support for the theory in that the frogs use a wide variety of songs to give the illusion to invading frogs that the territory they are trying to enter is already full of competing frogs.

The Beau Geste hypothesis has also been found to explain vocalizations within some cricket species such as the bush cricket, where males use a wide variety of songs to assess the amount of competition which is in a given area. When males are present in an area with a large number of other males their vocal repertories are much smaller than when in an area with only a few males.
