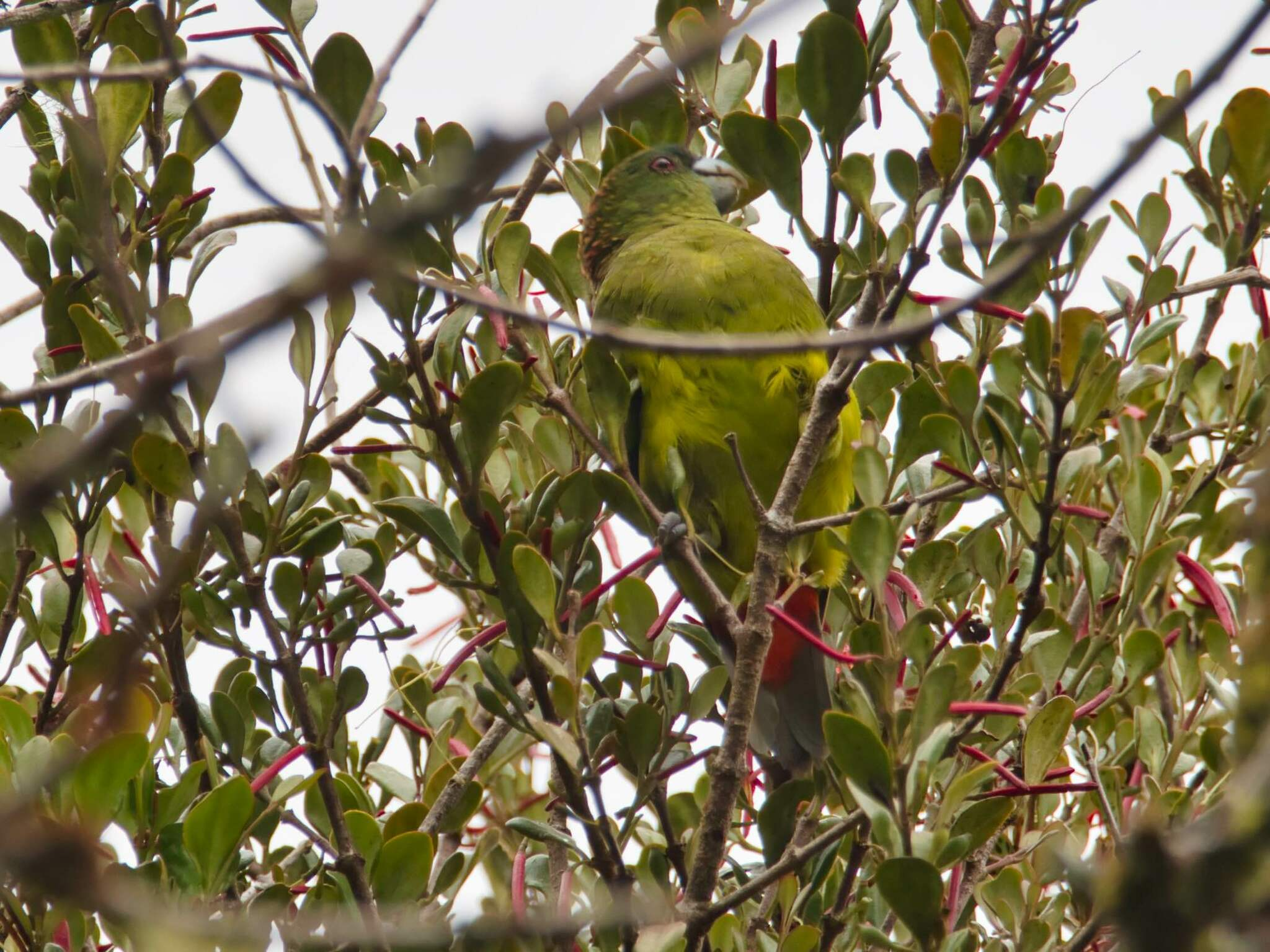

Conservation status
- Least Concern (IUCN 3.1)

Scientific classification
- Kingdom: Animalia
- Phylum: Chordata
- Class: Aves
- Order: Psittaciformes
- Family: Psittaculidae
- Genus: Psittacella
- Species: P. madaraszi

Binomial name
- Psittacella madaraszi Meyer, 1886

= Madarasz's tiger parrot =

Species of bird

Madarasz's tiger parrot (Psittacella madaraszi) is a species of parrot in the family Psittaculidae native to New Guinea. Its natural habitat is subtropical or tropical moist montane forests.

Its common name and Latin binomial commemorate the Hungarian ornithologist Gyula von Madarász.

== Description ==
Madarasz's tiger parrot is a relatively small parrot, with a height of about 14 cm and an average weight of around 34–44 grams. Males and females feature an olive/brown head. From crown to hindneck, it has yellow feathers, giving it speckled appearance. The throat area has a more dull yellow hue. The upper breast is olive in color. It has green tail feathers with red undertail coverts. The beak is a light blue/grey tipped with white. Females have a blue wash on the forehead and an orange wash on the nape and hindneck.
