= Haimi Fenichel =

Israeli artist and sculptor

Haimi Fenichel (Hebrew: חיימי פניכל; born 1972) is an Israeli sculptor and installation artist.

== Biography ==
Haimi Fenichel was named for his uncle, Haim Fenichel, who was killed in the Six-Day War in 1967 and received the a medal of honor after his death. Fenichel studied at Bezalel Academy of Art and Design in Jerusalem and the Academy of Arts, Architecture and Design in Prague.

== Art career ==
In his exhibit "Mound," Fenichel produces a space that resembles a building site but projects a sense of impending ruin. He plays with materials in a way that creates new combinations and hybrids that are both familiar and alien. The artist says the work is about time and what it is made out of. "Mound" is a combination construction site-archaeological dig created from hardened sand.

- 2008:
1. "Bizarre Perfection" in Israel Museum in Jerusalem.
2. "Exposición de las obras ganadoras y finalistas del III Concurso de Pintura y Escultura Figurativas" Foundation Fran Dural, Madrid
- 2006:
1. Jerusalem, The Israel Museum, Mini Israel
2. London, Ben Uri Gallery, The London Jewish Museum, Israeli Contemporary Applied Arts
- 2005:
1. Petah Tikva, Israel - Petah Tikva Museum of Art, Transpositions
2. Kfar Vradim - Tal Gallery, My Personal Box

== Awards and recognition ==
- 2008: Grand Jury Award, III Concurso de Pintura y Escultura Figurativas, Foundation Fran Dural, Barcelona.
- 2007: The Haifa Museum of Art, Prizes in Art and Design and Young Artist Award from the Ministry of Science, Culture and Sport
- 2005: Winner, Alix de Rothschild Craft Award

His work is in the collection of the Israel Museum, Jerusalem.

== See also ==
- Visual arts in Israel
