= Sámuel Fenichel =

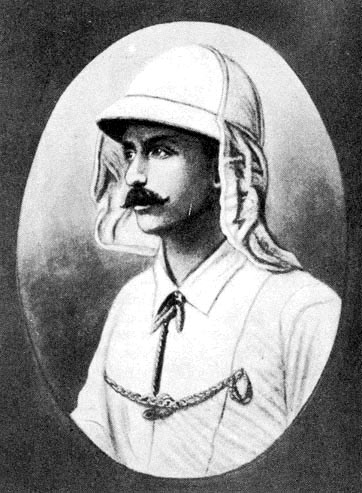
Portrait of Sámuel Fenichel

Sámuel Fenichel (25 August 1868 – 12 March 1893) was a Hungarian naturalist, collector, and explorer who died after a very brief period of 14 months in Papua New Guinea. His main collections were insect specimens, and several species have been named after him.

Fenichel was born in Nagyenyed and went to Bethlen College where he was influenced by Károly Herepey. Initially interested in archaeology, he spent some time working at the Bucharest archaeological museum from 1888. He travelled to Dobrudja in Romania during which time he met Albert Grubauer, a German naturalist who was planning an expedition to New Guinea. Fenichel showed interest, resigned from his post and joined Grubauer but with the understanding that he would obtain material for the Hungarian National Museum. They reached German New Guinea in 1891 and began collecting insect specimens. Grubauer left due to poor health, but Fenichel stayed on collecting nearly 25,000 specimens. Fenichel too fell ill, possibly from malaria, and in 1893 this led to severe kidney problems that led to his death at Stephansort. Fenichel was an inspiration for the naturalist-explorer Lajos Bíró.

Fenichel's collections including insects and objects of ethnographic interest are now in the Hungarian National Museum. A memorial plaque in Port Moresby University commemorates his life. Several species of insect described from his collections have been named after him including Coccorchestes fenicheli, Eophileurus fenicheli, and Euscheloribates fenicheli.
